= Austrian walled towns =

History of walled towns in Austria

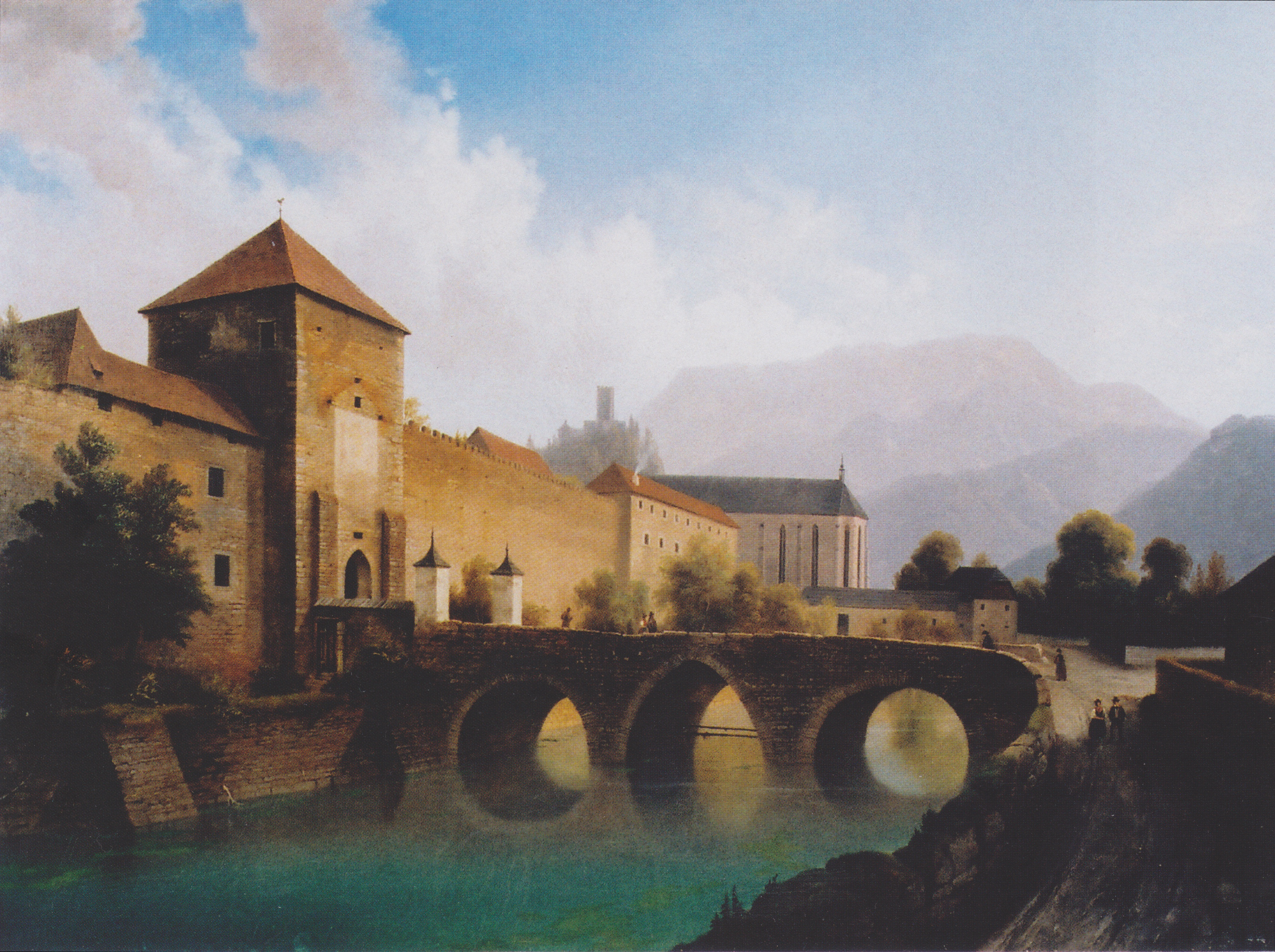
The Olsator gate and walls overlooking the moat in Friesach. Painting by Markus Pernhart.

The earliest Austrian walled towns started to appear in the late 11th century to the early 13th century. Their establishment was closely connected with the development of Austria as a march of the Holy Roman Empire and in particular by the Hohenstaufen emperors and their Marcher Lords, the Babenbergs. In present-day Austria, there are 106 towns or cities that were walled. The walls of Radstadt, Freiburg, Hainburg and Drosendorf survive almost intact, and Austria has some of the most impressive walled towns in Europe.

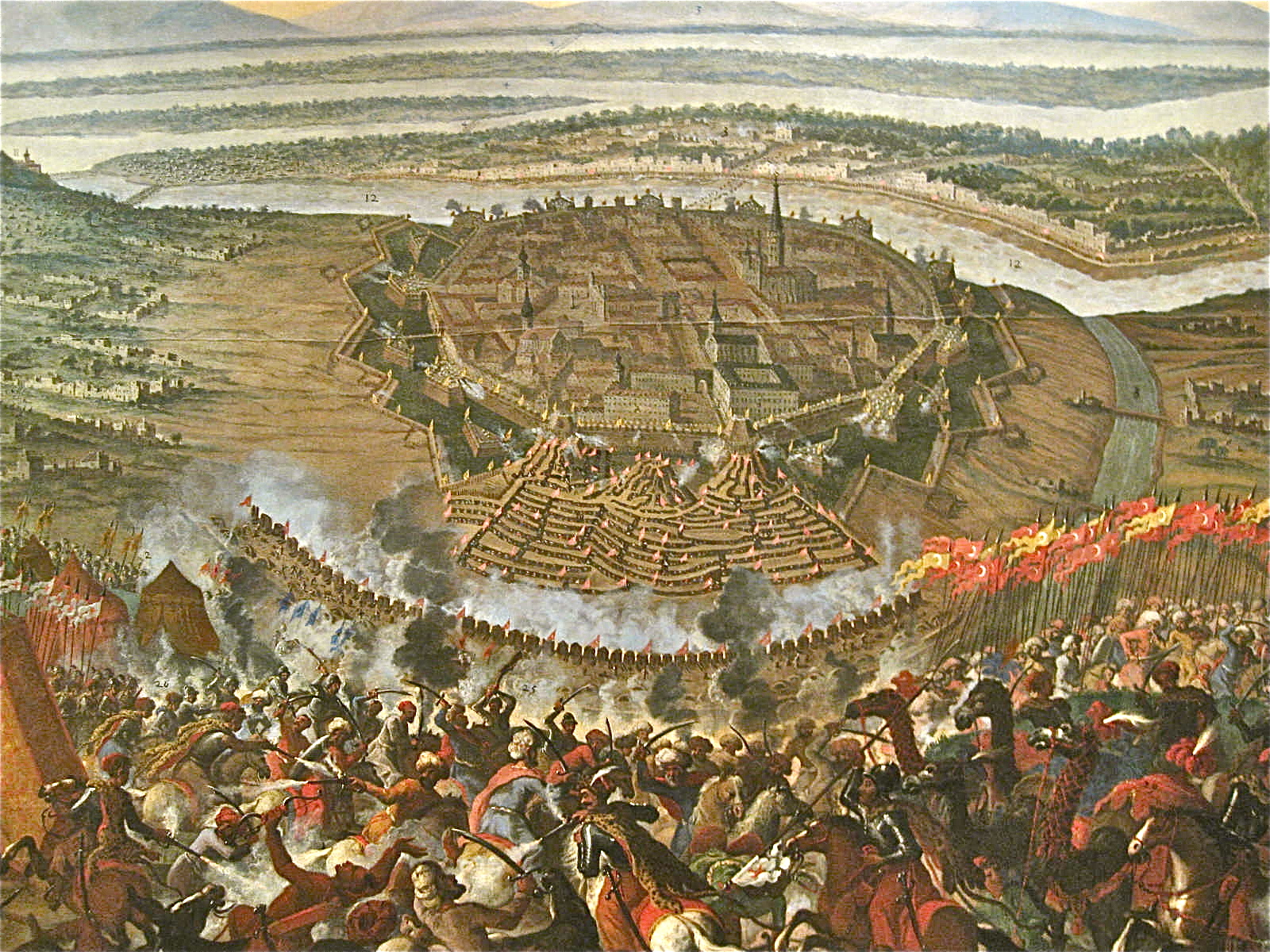
Painting of the Turkish Siege of Vienna, showing the walls of Vienna.

Other cities or towns such as Vienna, Salzburg and St Pölten have had their defences almost obliterated. In Austria, the procedure for granting civic status or creating a Stadt was relatively simple. Initially, a local lord or official ministerialis could petition for market rights (Marktrecht), after that, the town would be laid out by a surveyor and it would have been surrounded by an earthen-banked enclosure surmounted with a vertical wooden palisade. Often a stone gatehouse (Tor) would be built for the collection of custom dues from traders coming to the market. When a town was granted a charter or borough rights (Stadtrecht), in most cases, a wall was being built or provision for its construction and financing were included in the charter.

== Types of town wall and layout ==
=== Towns with Roman fortifications ===
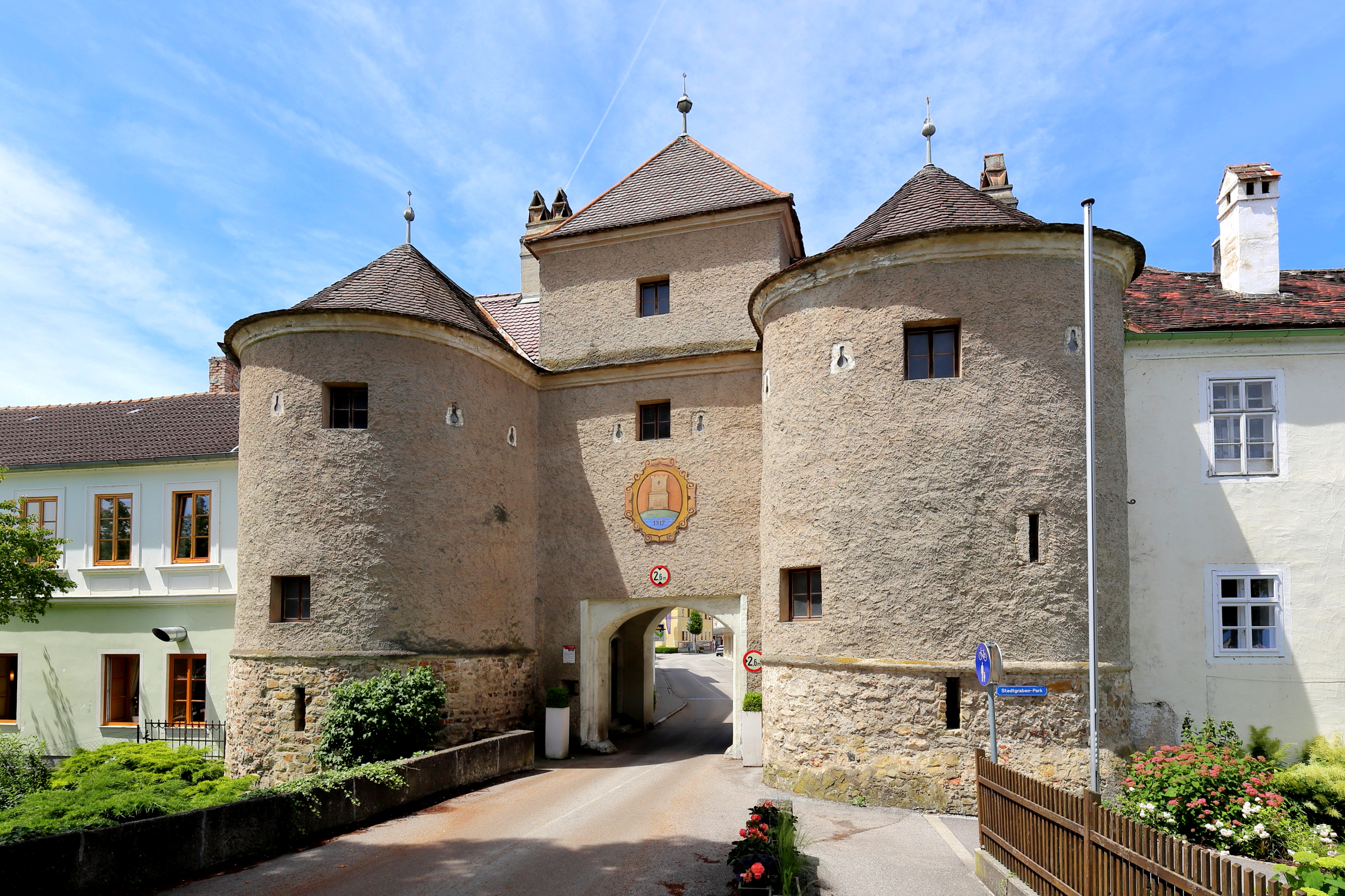
"Römertor" Roman gateway rebuilt in c. 1500 in Traismauer, Austria

These include towns with Roman defences that were re-fortified in the 12th and 13th centuries, which formed part of the Roman limes, which were to the south of the Danube. These include the Flavian (late 1st century AD) auxiliary forts at Mautern, Traismauer, Tulln, possibly Pochlarn, and the Legionary fortress at Vienna.

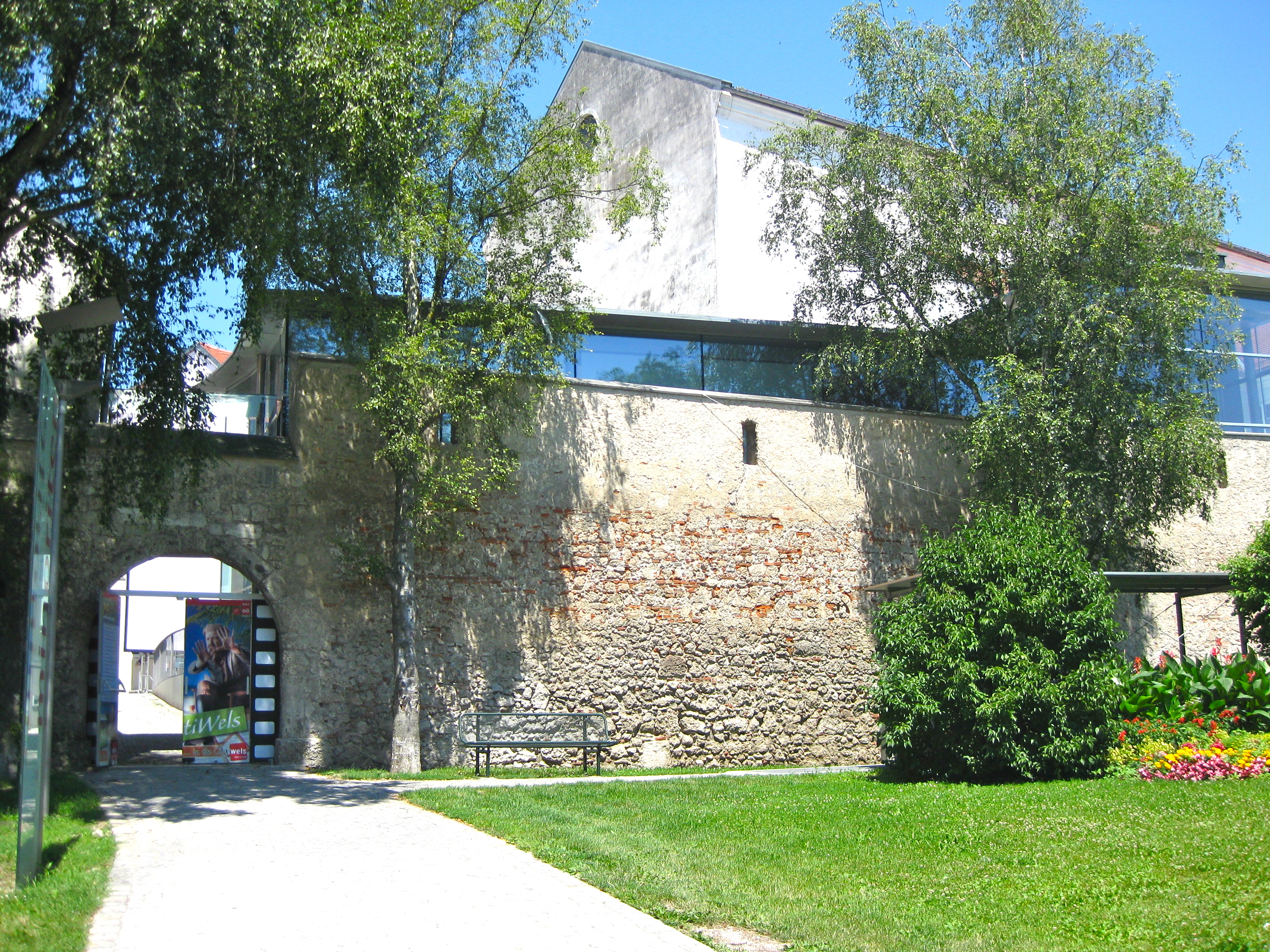
Town walls at Wels. Original Roman wall. Roman tile was re-used with over the medieval wall.

At Traismauer, the medieval defences almost exactly correspond with the rectangular auxiliary fort, while at Mautern the walls match the auxiliary fort together with the 3rd century extension to the north side. But at Tulln and Vienna, the medieval walled area was larger than the Roman fort. The walls of Roman towns were also incorporated into later town walls at Linz, St. Pölten and Wels. The site of the Roman municipium of Luvarum (in Salzburg) underlies most of the Altstadt (old city). In the 4th century, the Roman Emperor Valentinian I re-organised the Roman defences along the Danube by building a series of watchtowers or "Burgi", which were sometimes built into earlier fortifications. It is now recognised that the large bastion-shaped tower at Mautern is not medieval, but Roman. There are also similar Roman towers attached to the walls at Traismauer and Tulln.

=== Towns with an ovoid defensive enclosure ===
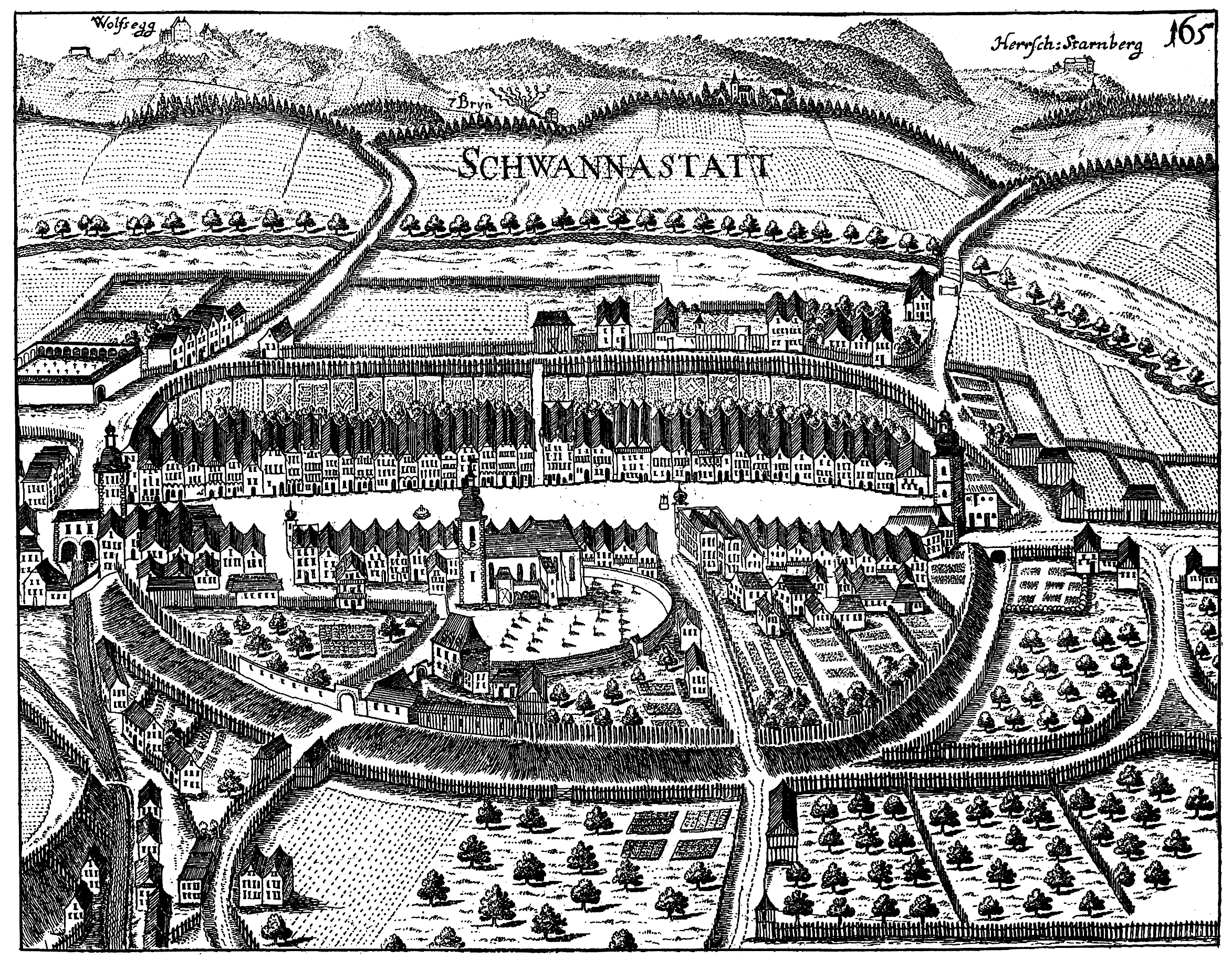
Schwanenstadt. Illustration by Vischer.

This form of town is best illustrated by a 17th-century print by Georg Matthäus Vischer of Schwanenstadt in Upper Austria. He shows the town with a long rectangular marketplace at the ends of which stone gate-towers were set into the earthen palisaded bank. Amstetten in Lower Austria is very similar and some of the earthen bank survives, but instead of a rectangular marketplace it has the early spindle-shaped form. In Upper Austria and the Tyrol, this form of layout can be associated with the early Bavarian settlers who started to establish themselves in the 7th century. Other examples of these towns, such as Braunau and Hall, have been modified by the building of later castles. Under Charlemagne, the Bavarians moved eastwards down the Danube and into modern Hungary. The original defensive layout of Korneuburg, to the north of Vienna, is almost ovoid in plan and predates the internal street grid layout, which dates from around 1298. Zistersdorf, close to the Slovakian border, also has an ovoid layout, modified by the building of the later castle. Both Schwanenstadt and Zistersdorf have large and important Germanic cemeteries that have been recently excavated, suggesting that they were early settlements.

=== Early walled towns ===
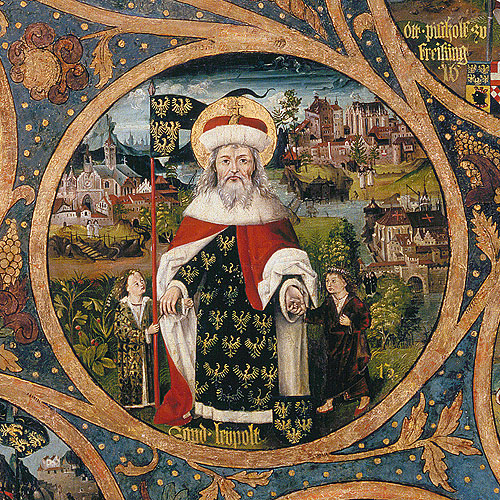
Leopold III, Margrave of Austria. The margrave granted early charters to Krems, Vienna and Klosterneuberg.

From the 10th century, following the defeat of the Magyars at the battle of Lechfeld in 955, the Bavarians started to establish themselves around Melk and Herzogenburg in Lower Austria in the so-called "Kernland". In 976 Leopold I of Babenberg became the first margave of the "Ostmark" of the Holy Roman Empire and the first reference to "Ostarrîchi" occurs in 996, which gives Austria its name. Leopold, his son Henry I and his grandson Adalbert, expanded their territory into the Wienerwald in the east up to the Hungarian border. Under the Babenberg Ernest the Brave (1055–1075) sees the appearance of Hadmar I and the Kuenringer family, a family of imperial officials or "ministerialis" who played an important part in the colonisation of the Waldviertel. The Kuenringer worked closely with Leopold II (1075–1095) who moved his main residence from Melk to Gars am Kamp. It seems likely that the first widespread construction of stone walls for towns starts in the late 12th century or early 13th century. The Kuenringers established five towns, Dürnstein, Zwettl, Weitra, Waidhofen an der Thaya and Zistersdorf, the first four of which survive today as remarkably well preserved examples of walled towns. The Kuenringers also held Litschau from 1237 to 1297 and may have been responsible for the walls of this town as well.

=== Promontory towns ===
Promontory styled walled towns can take two forms, either a wall is made across the constricted neck of a looped bend in a river, or on a raised spur of land at the point where one river enters another river at an acute angle. Towns of both types tend to be more common in the Czech Republic than in Austria, and Český Krumlov town on the Vltava is a classic example of the first type. Leoben is another example but is a rectangular town with a grid plan layout that has been placed across a bend in a river. Examples of promontory forts between two rivers occur at Drosendorf on the Thaya, close to the Bohemian border and has a typical promontory layout, suggesting that it is of Slavic origin. Judenburg in Styria is another example of this type of walled town.

=== Rectangular frontier trading towns ===
This is a small group of towns which were established to facilitate trade on the existing frontiers of the Holy Roman Empire or between the margraves of its marches. The walled towns form a rectangular shape, and cover a greater area than other early walled towns. An example is Wiener Neustadt, one of the earliest towns in Austria to have been granted Stadtrecht, it was a new town laid out after 1192 by the Babenberg Duke Leopold V of Austria, following his acquisition of the Duchy of Styria. Silver paid in 1194 from the ransom of Richard the Lionhart was used to finance the building of the walls. The defences of Wiener Neustadt are rectangular, measuring 600 by 680 metres. Granted a charter in 1210 the town lies on the historic boundary between the Duchy of Styria and Hungarian Kingdom.

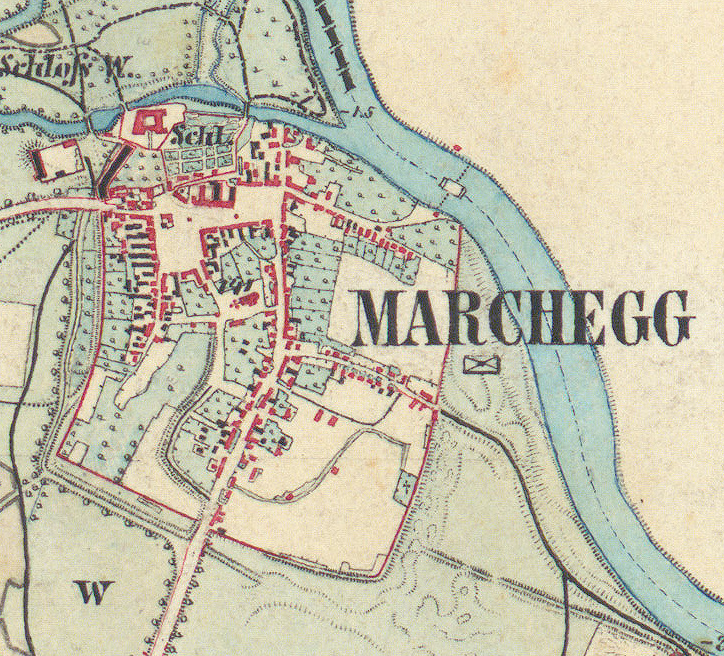
Marchegg town from the Franziszeische Landesaufnahme map. 2nd Military Survey c. 1835, showing the large unoccupied area within the walls.

Other examples are Freistadt, in Upper Austria, which was on the border with Bohemia, Retz and Laa an der Thaya in Lower Austria, and Moravia. Marchegg, which was on the borders with both Moravia and Hungary, was established by the Bohemian King Ottokar II, but when he was defeated and killed in 1268 by Duke Rudolf at the nearby battle of Durnkrut, the town continued to be laid-out and walled by the Archduke. It probably covered the greatest area of any early walled towns, but Marchegg was not successful. Even today a large area of the enclosed town has never been built on. Within the Hungarian Kingdom and particularly present day Slovakia, reciprocal trading towns such as Trnava, were built.

=== Composite and double towns ===
Composite towns take two forms. A town may grow and show signs of being progressively extended and then being surrounded by a wall, or it may have a number of separate entities and a degree of separate governance, but is regarded as a unit and in most cases has a single charter. Examples of "double towns" are Krems and Stein. Stein has 9th-century origins as a customs collection centre on the Danube, and was probably walled in the early 13th century. It is immediately adjacent to Krems, which is equally as old. In 1305, a joint charter was granted to both towns as "Krems und Stein". Klosterneuburg and Korneuburg started as double towns on both sides of the Danube but were then split by Duke Albrecht in the late 13th century. Murau is an example of two linked settlements on either side of a river. Herzogenburg consisted of two towns with a joint charter.

=== Smaller settlements with walled defenses ===
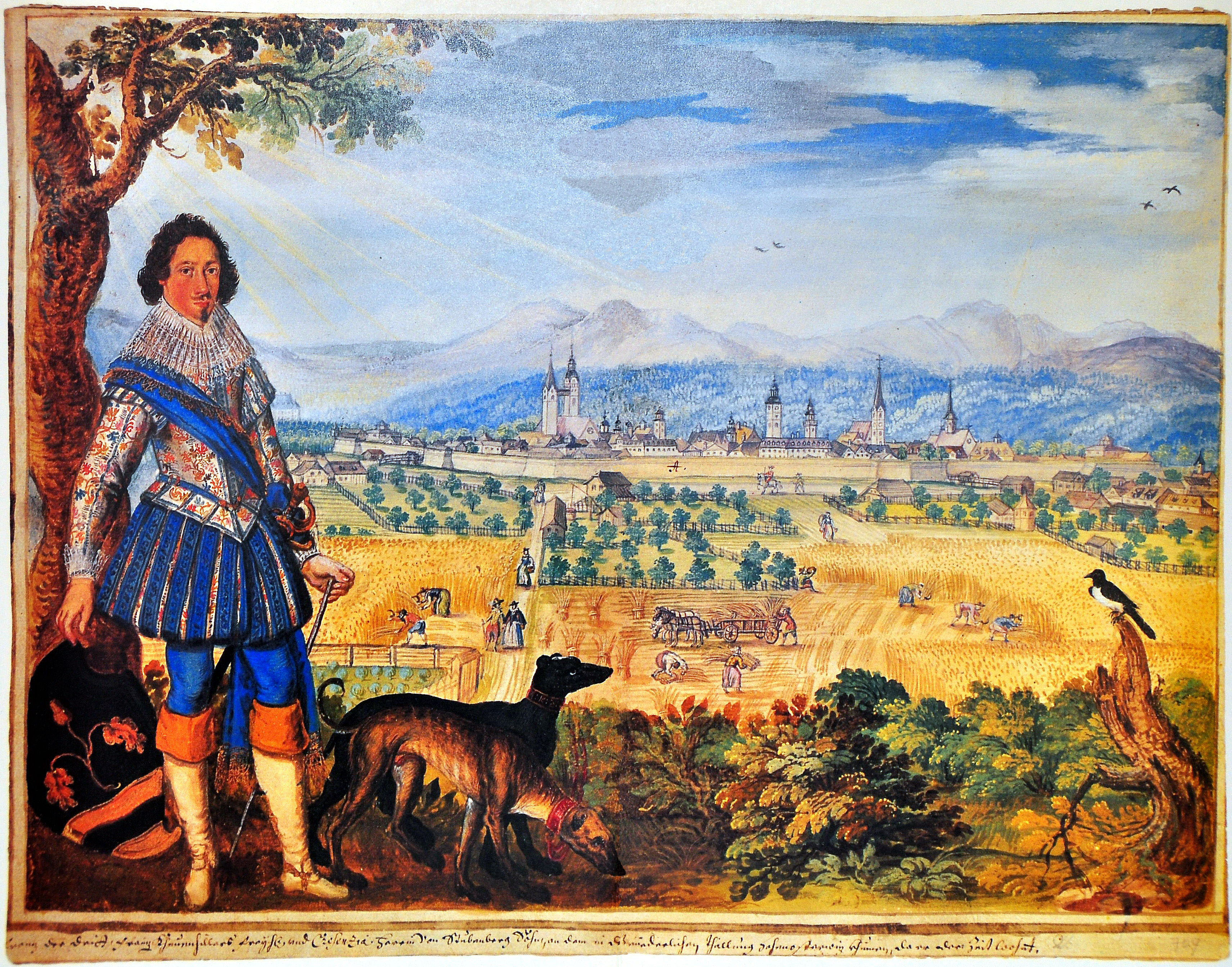
Painting of Freiherr Franz III Khevenhüller and the fortifications of Klagenfurt, 1615.

There also were smaller settlements, market towns and villages with defenses, which might collectively be described as Stadtchen. These occur particularly in Burgenland, but also in Styria, and East Tyrol. They are primarily defenses against Turkish incursions and marauding Hungarian brigands. These walled and defended settlements were mainly constructed in the period between the first siege of Vienna in 1529 and the second siege in 1683. In 1622 the Esterhazy family succeeded to the control of the area around Eisenstadt (the modern Burgenland) and in light of the threats from the Turks and the marauding Hungarian groups, started fortification of the larger villages and settlements. At Oggau am Neusiedler See, the walls may have started to be built earlier following the Bocskay rebellion in 1605, which had left the small market town devastated. Other settlements in Burgenland to be walled were Rust, (which together with the Altstadt at Eisenstadt) which were now given the special status of "Royal Free Cities" and Purbach and Donnerskirchen. The four settlements – Oggau am Neusiedler See, Purbach, Rust and Donnerskirchen – formed a defended group along the western edge of the Neusiedler See. Around 1640 probably all of these settlements had angled bastions added to the walls for mounted artillery.

=== Tabor and fortified villages ===
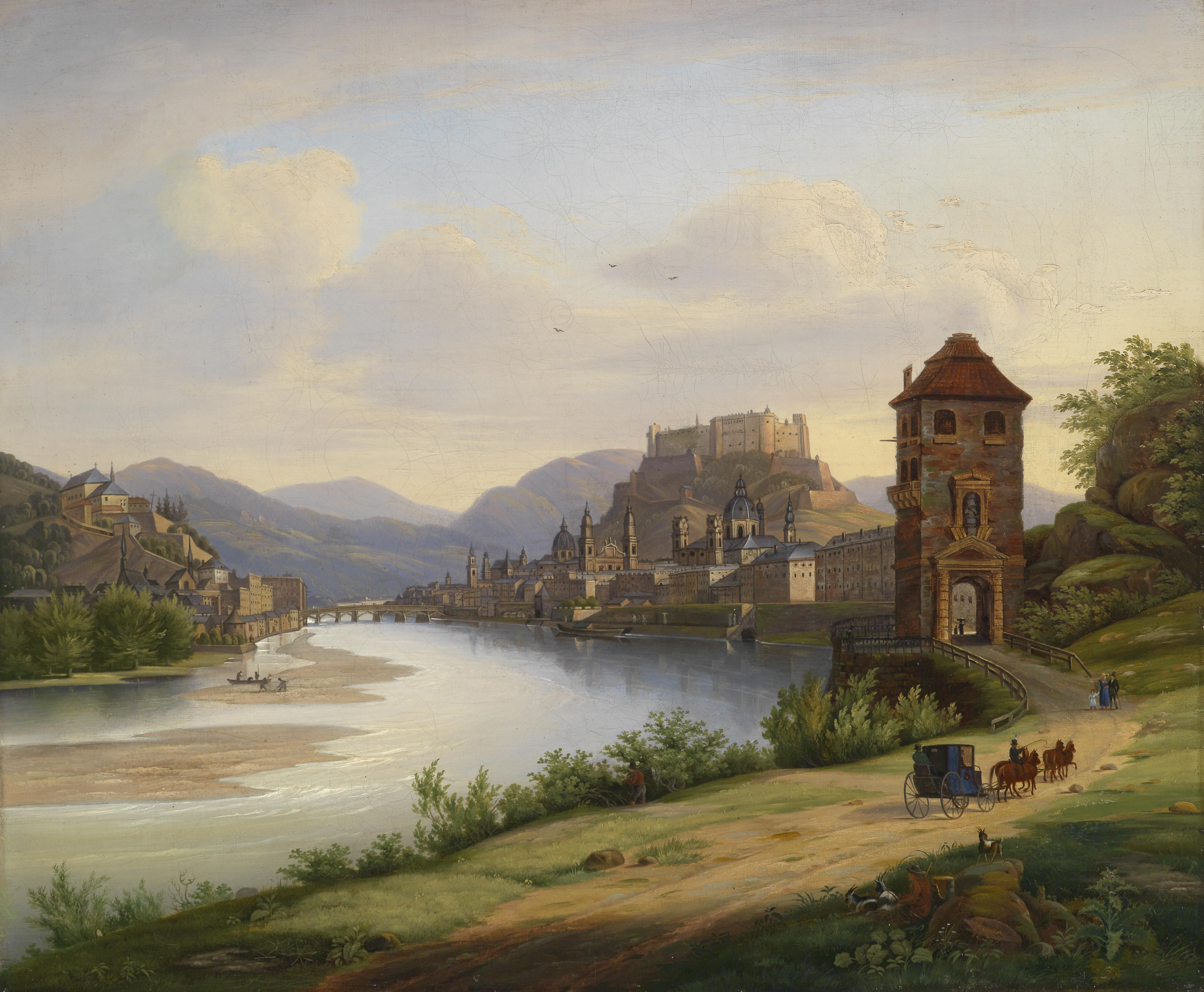
Salzburg with a gate tower on the right. Painting by Jakob Roedler.

At Feldbach in Styria in the 17th century, a fortified group of houses known as the Tabor were built round the church, with an outer group of houses with inset gates, to counter Hungarian brigands. There were also similar Tabor buildings constructed around the church at nearby Gleisdorf, which capitulated to the Turks in 1532 and also another one at Frohnleiten.

An enclosure with a gate-tower of Tabor form also exists at Neunkirchen on the border of Lower Austria with Styria. Here the church is surrounded by a circle of houses. This was an early settlement, and the church was first mentioned in 1094. In 1136, the Holy Roman Emperor Lothar II granted Neunkirchen market rights and a mint, but in 1294 these rights were transferred to the nearby newly founded Wiener Neustadt. Hallstatt, although granted Stadrecht, has a similar arrangement, with an arched entry to the marketplace, under a house. This arrangement is probably dictated by the constricted nature of the site, where walls would not have served any purpose.

Another example of a walled village is Sachsenburg in East Tyrol. These bear comparison with the fortified villages of Istria such as Hum and Boljun and also Zumberk in Bohemia. Another smaller settlement that was fortified, but at an earlier date was Friedberg, in Styria, which, in the 12th century, was fortified as a refuge point on the Wechel Strasse (Trade Road), between Wiener Neustadt and Gleisdorf.

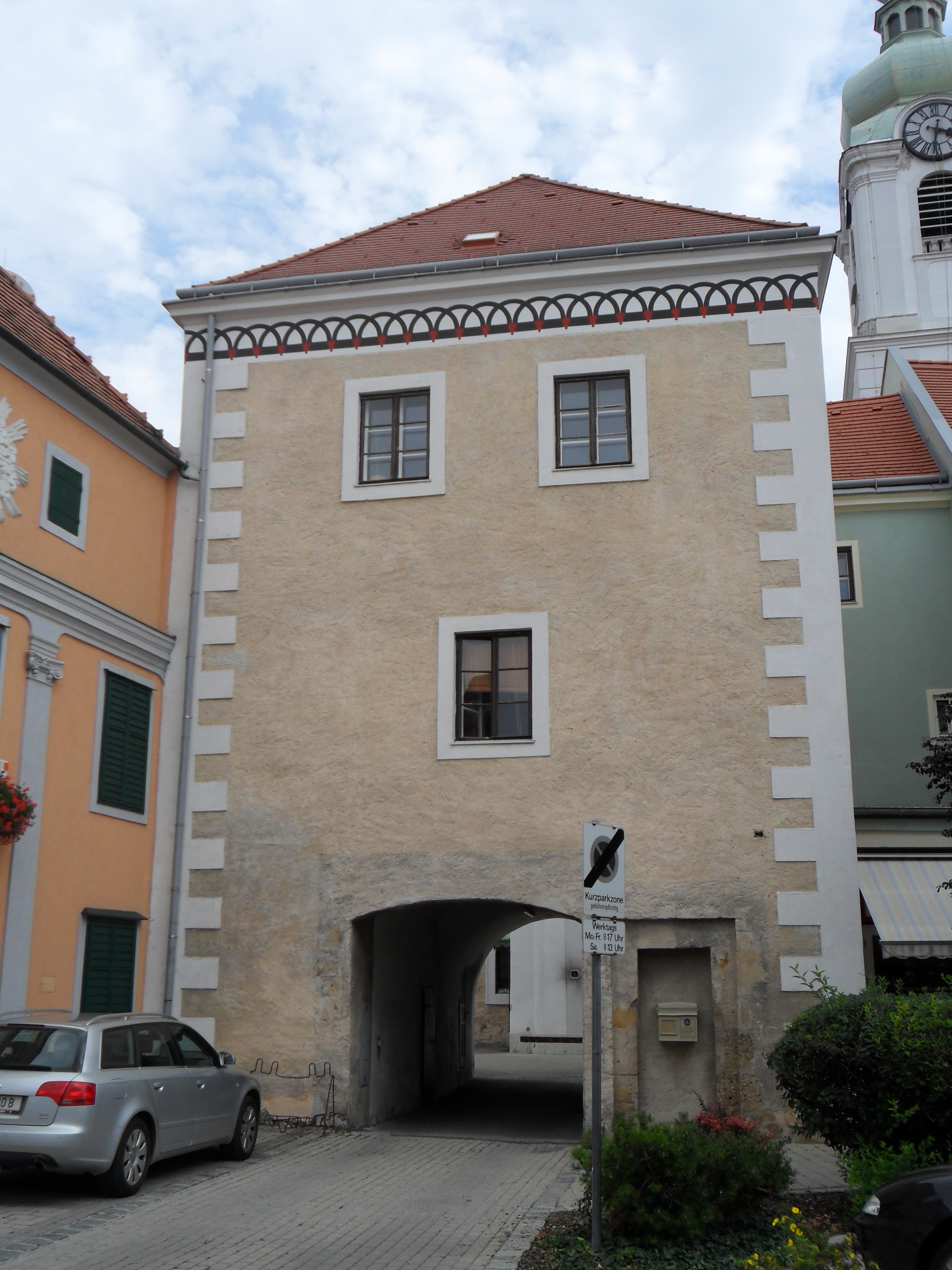
Stadttor in Neunkirchen

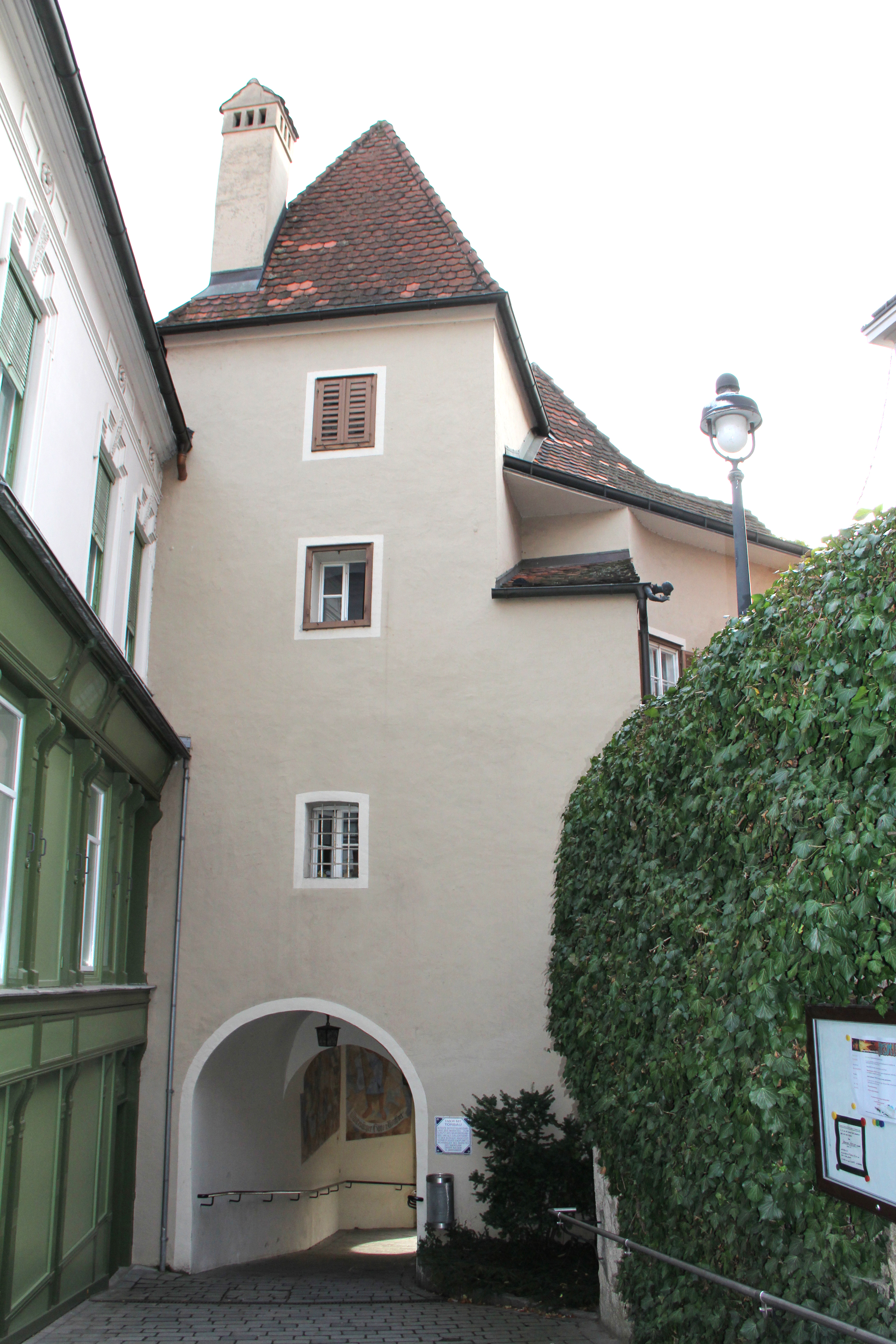
Frohnleiten Tabor Gateway

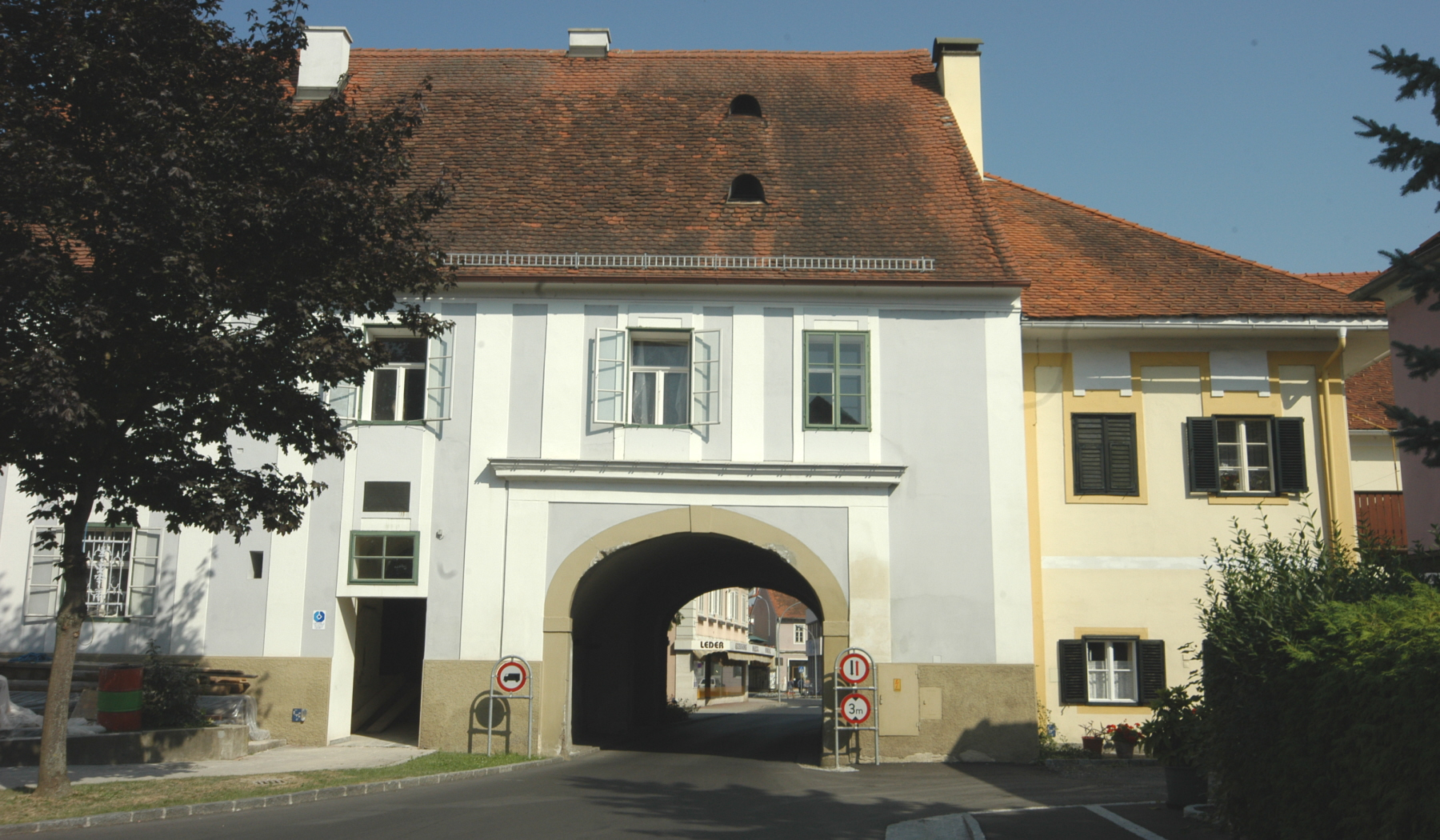
Feldbach Grazer Tor, which is the gateway to the Tabor

== Function and construction ==
Apart from those instances where town walls date from the Roman period, building walls in stone only started in Austria in the late 12th and the 13th centuries. The defence of towns was only a minor consideration, and it was castles which were highly defended and subject to sieges. The purpose of walls was to extract market and other tolls from people entering or leaving the town, to demarcate an area where craftsmen could work freely without being subject to feudal service and dues, and to provide basic security for the inhabitants. The gate-towers, which in Austria were often tall and impressive structures, were used for the collection of tolls. In many Austrian towns the gatehouses are positioned at either end of a long rectangular or spindle-shaped marketplace. In the case of the rectangular marketplaces, one or two houses will partly close off the area in front of the gatehouses, causing a constriction to funnel people through the gatehouse. The spindle-shaped marketplaces also funnelled people through the gatehouses at either end.

Little detailed work has yet been undertaken on how walls were constructed. The exception to this are the studies on the walls at Drosendorf, Zwettl, Horn and Freistadt. At Zwettl walls have been built in short sections, corresponding to adjacent burgage holdings, suggesting that particular length of wall was the responsibility of the burgage holder. The walls at Drosendorf do not appear to have been built by professional masons and there is widespread of use of Opus spicatum, a herringbone arrangement of building stones, which also occurs in Romanesque church buildings. This contrasts with the walls at Grossenzersdorf, where masons from the Stephans Dom in Vienna built 2.2 kilometers of wall between 1396 and 1399, using reclaimed stone and tile from the Roman site at Carnuntum.

=== Wall thickness, hoardings, crenellations and arrow slits ===
The earliest town walls would be built to a great height on a narrow base. The illustration of Wiener Neustadt shows the considerable height of a wall built shortly after 1092. The walls at Friesach reach about 11 metres (36 ft) in height and this seems to be normal for early walls. At Gross-Enzersdorf the walls stand to about six metres with the crenellations still largely intact and the length of standing wall at is about 2.2 kilometres (1.4 mi). The wall varies in thickness from 90 to 160 centimetres.There are two types of town wall in Austria. The first is the 'narrow' wall which could be used to mount wooden walkways or wehrgang at the back and wooden hords or hoardings at the front. The second is the 'wide' wall, which is on a wider foundation and there is a solid stone wall-walk behind the merlons of the battlement. The line of the supports for former wooden walkways can often be seen on narrow walls by a series of Putlog holes, as at Durnstein. Initially the Merlons are not pierced by arrow or gunshots, but as the 14th century progresses, with the increased use of light artillery, this becomes more usual.

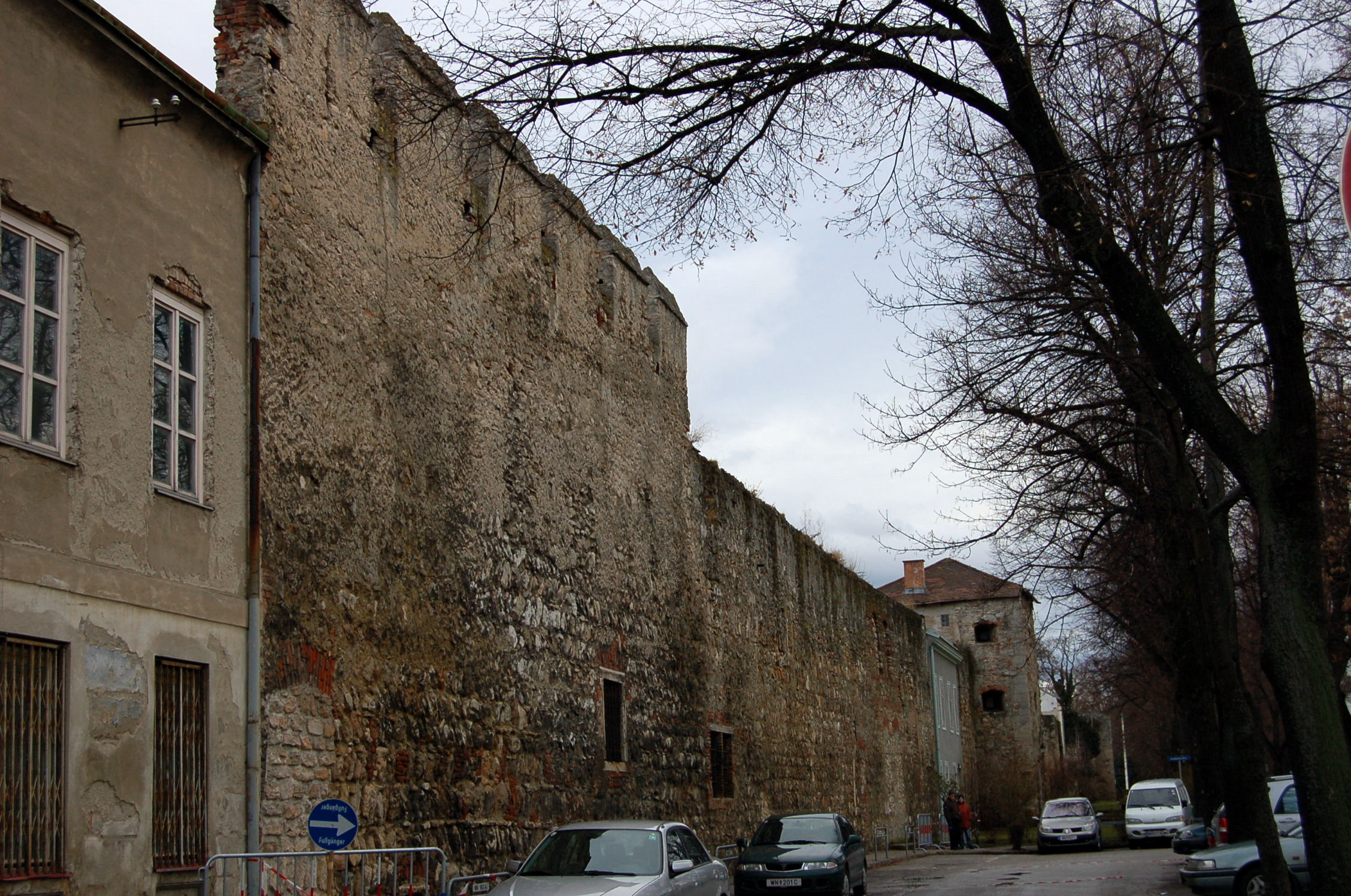
Early wall at Wiener Neustadt, showing the great height achieved on a narrow base.

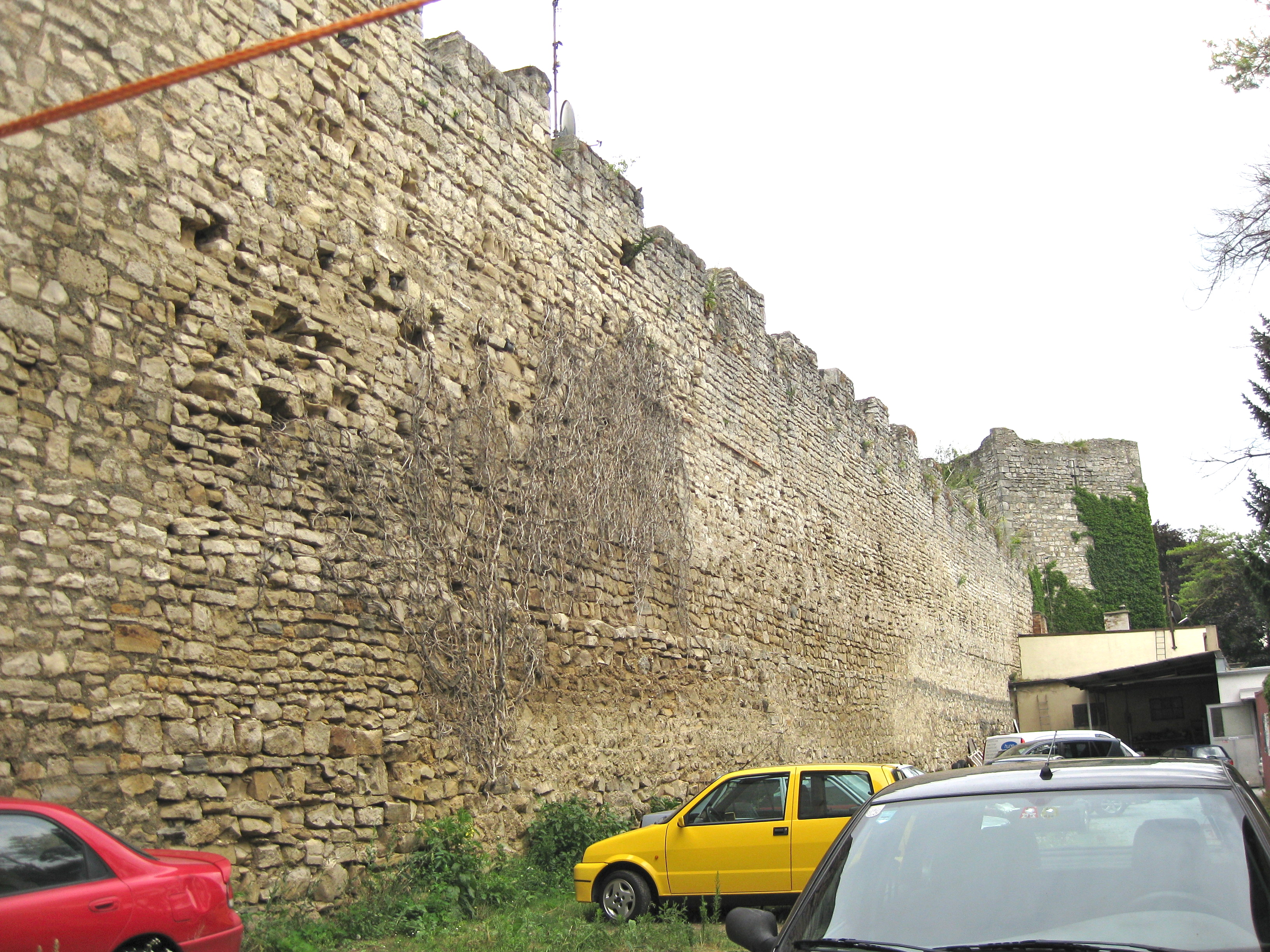
Hainburg an der Donau (Stadtmauer), south of the Wienertor

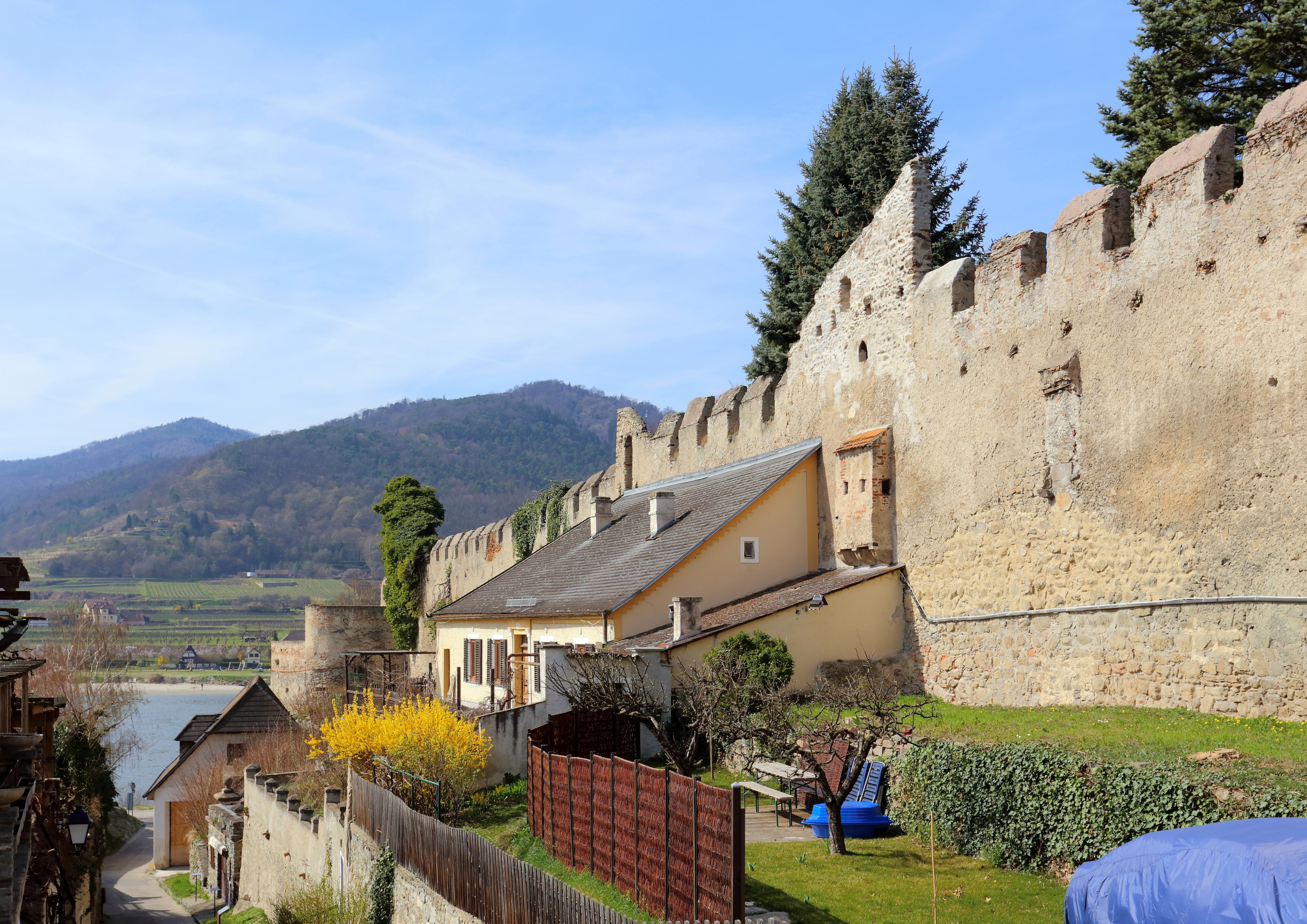
Durnstein an early wall without gun slots in the crenellations and with "putlog" holes to carry the walkway.

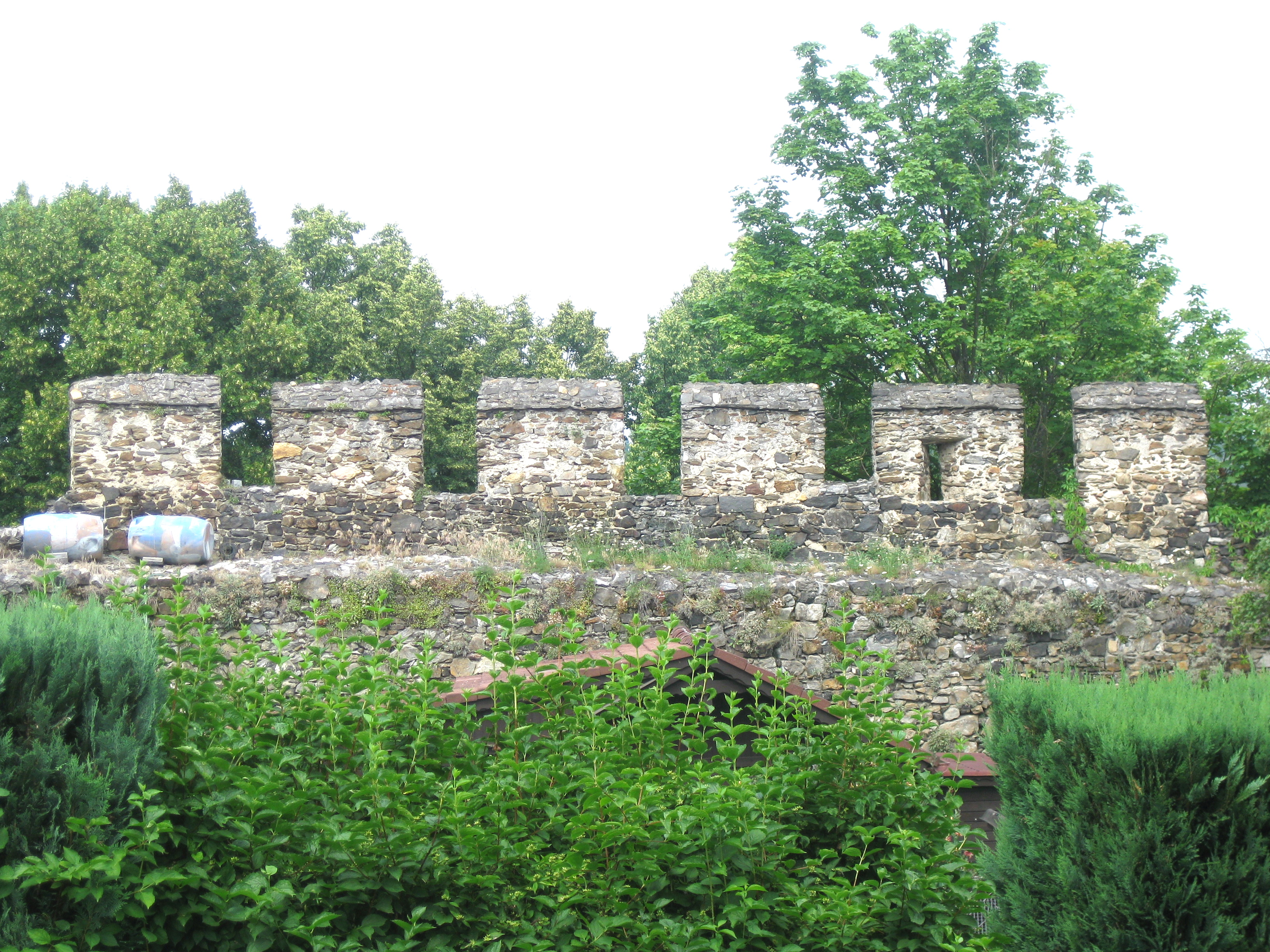
Drosendorf . A "wide" wall with crenellation and walkway

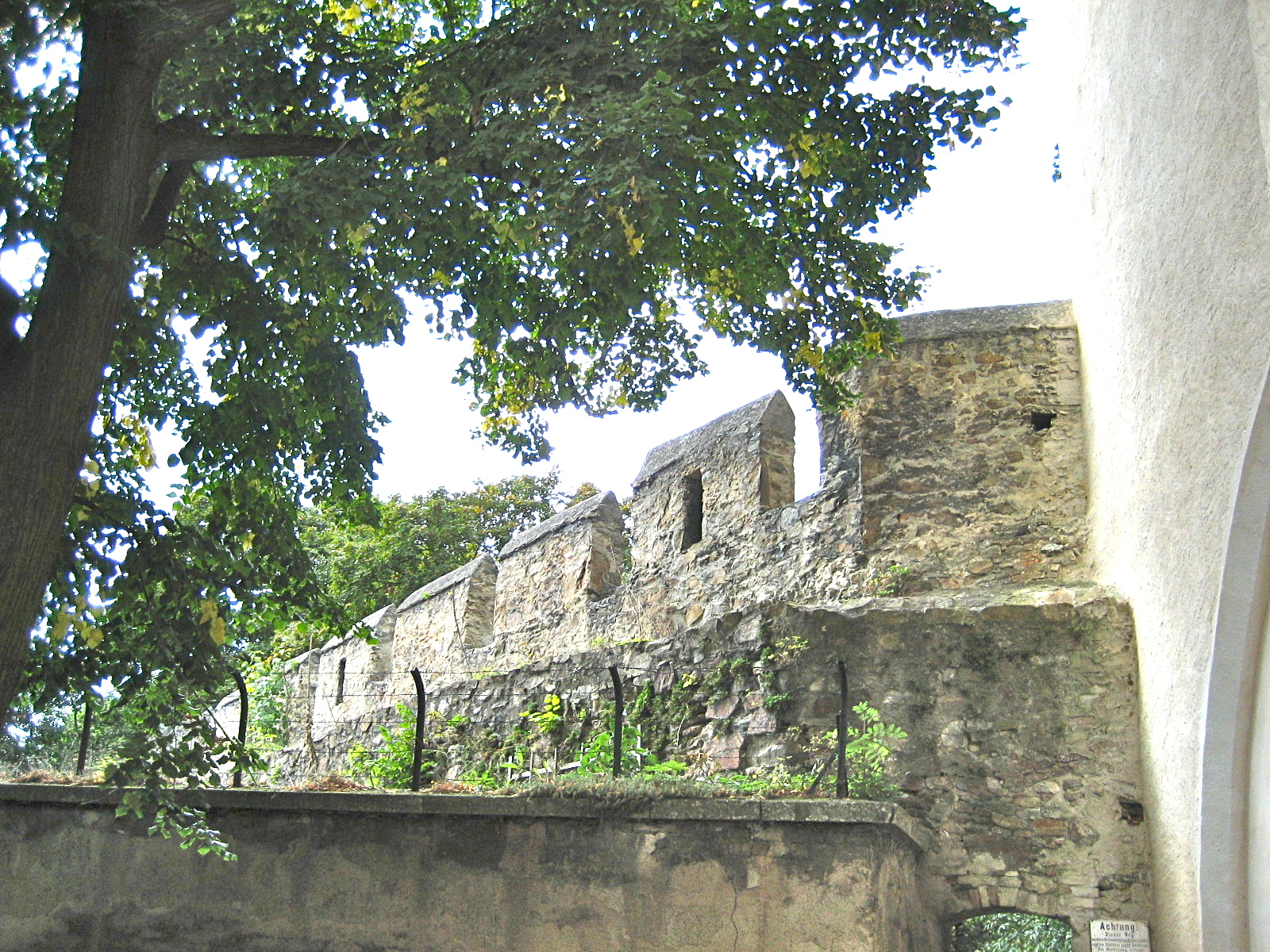
Town wall in Eggenburg showing merlons with central gun-ports.

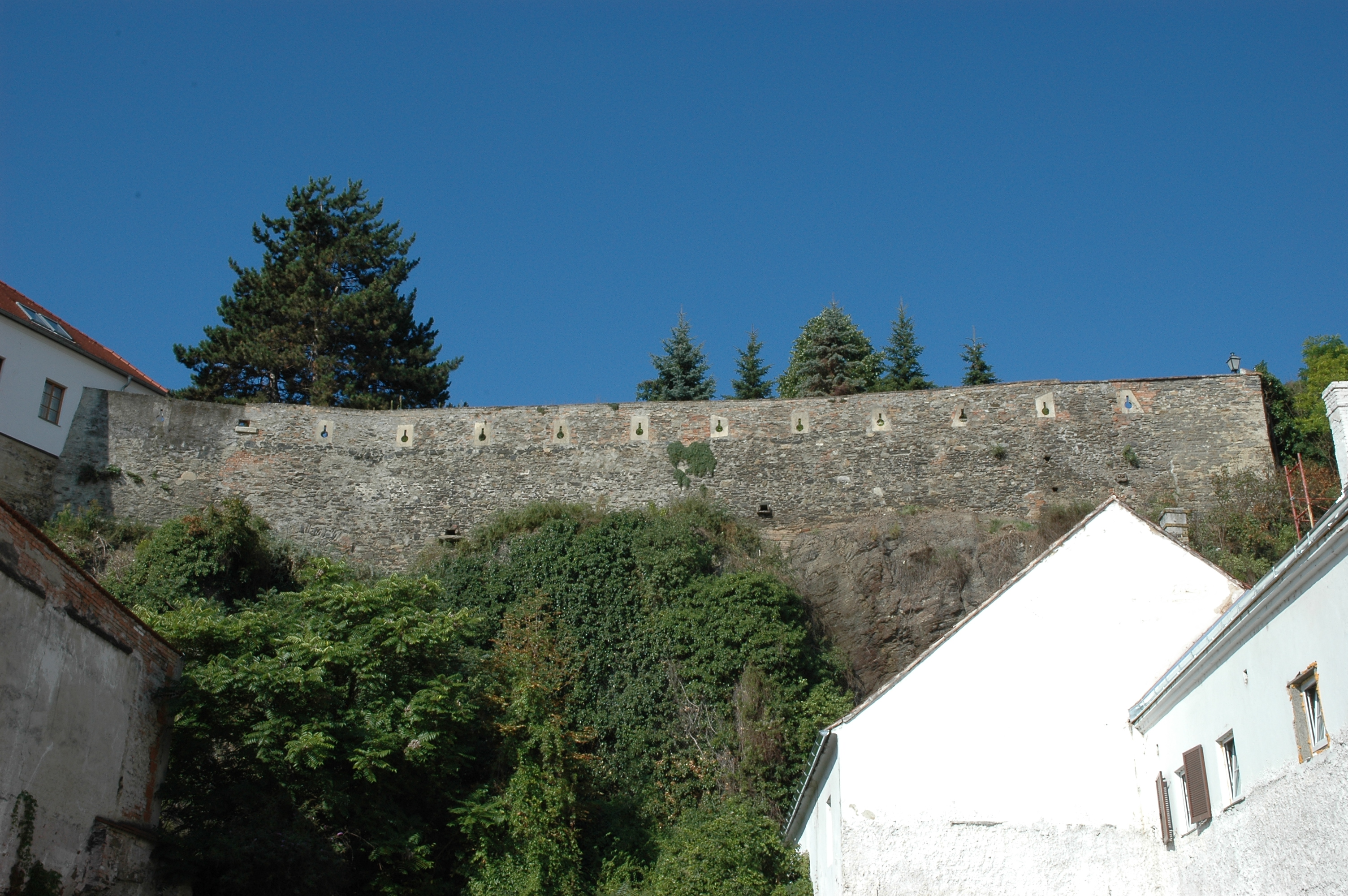
Equally placed gun-ports on the wall adjacent to the Pulverturm at Krems

=== Brick walls ===
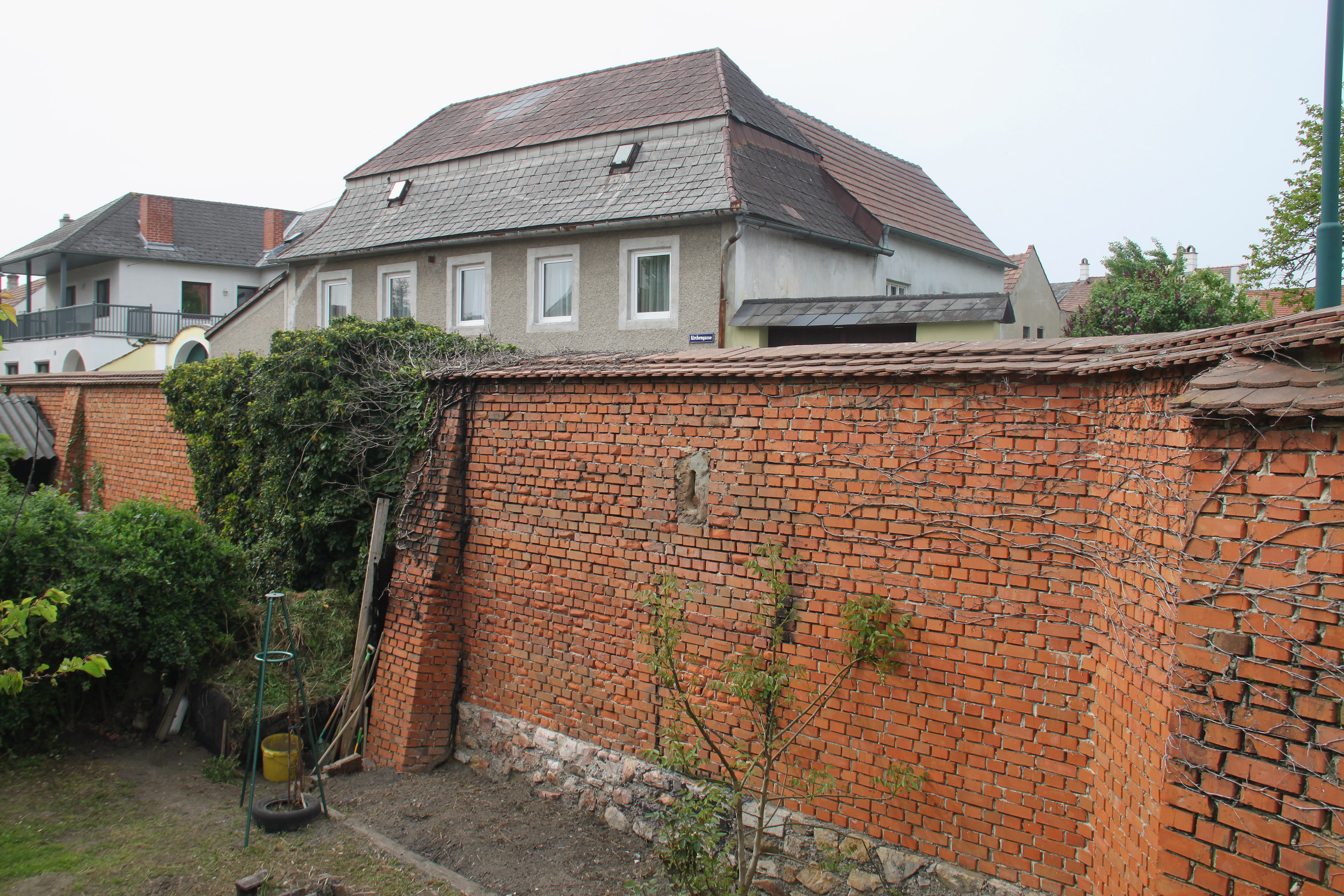
Traismauer-Restored brick walls with keyhole gunports

Walls constructed of brick are very common in Northern Europe and are associated with the Hanseatic towns, and in Poland with the German Knights. They do spread into the Czech Republic and Nymburk has remarkably well preserved brick walls and towers of the 12th century AD. Often brick walls are mounted on top of a low stone base. Frequently the bricks will have been robbed, leaving a low stone basal wall. This appears to have happened at Wilhelmsburg in Lower Austria. From the 16th century, brick was more widely used because it did not shatter so easily when hit by cannon fire. In Austria, Traismauer is an excellent example of a brick wall on a stone base. The Italian defences built at Radkersburg in south-eastern Styria used large quantities of brick in the 17th-century defences. The defences of Vienna, which were built in the later 17th century to resist the Turk, were of brick. The Italian architect Santino Solari also extensively used brick in the Salzburg defences.

=== Gate towers (Torturm) ===
The earliest gate towers of the late 12th and 13th centuries are squat, square-shaped structures. A good example of an early gate is the "Obere Tor" at Weitra, with a later Renaissance decorated parapet. Also in the 13th century, the squat towers have hipped roof added and grow in height. The east gate at Stein is an example. In the later 13th century, a "double drum" gate, with a gate between two towers, was built at Hainburg, which echoes other imperial gateways, as at Aachen. It is also in the style of earlier Roman gateways, and at Traismauer the Roman gate was rebuilt in 1504 in this form. Even taller gate towers were built in the 14th century and gate-towers at Freistadt, Wels, Vöcklabruck and Retz are examples.

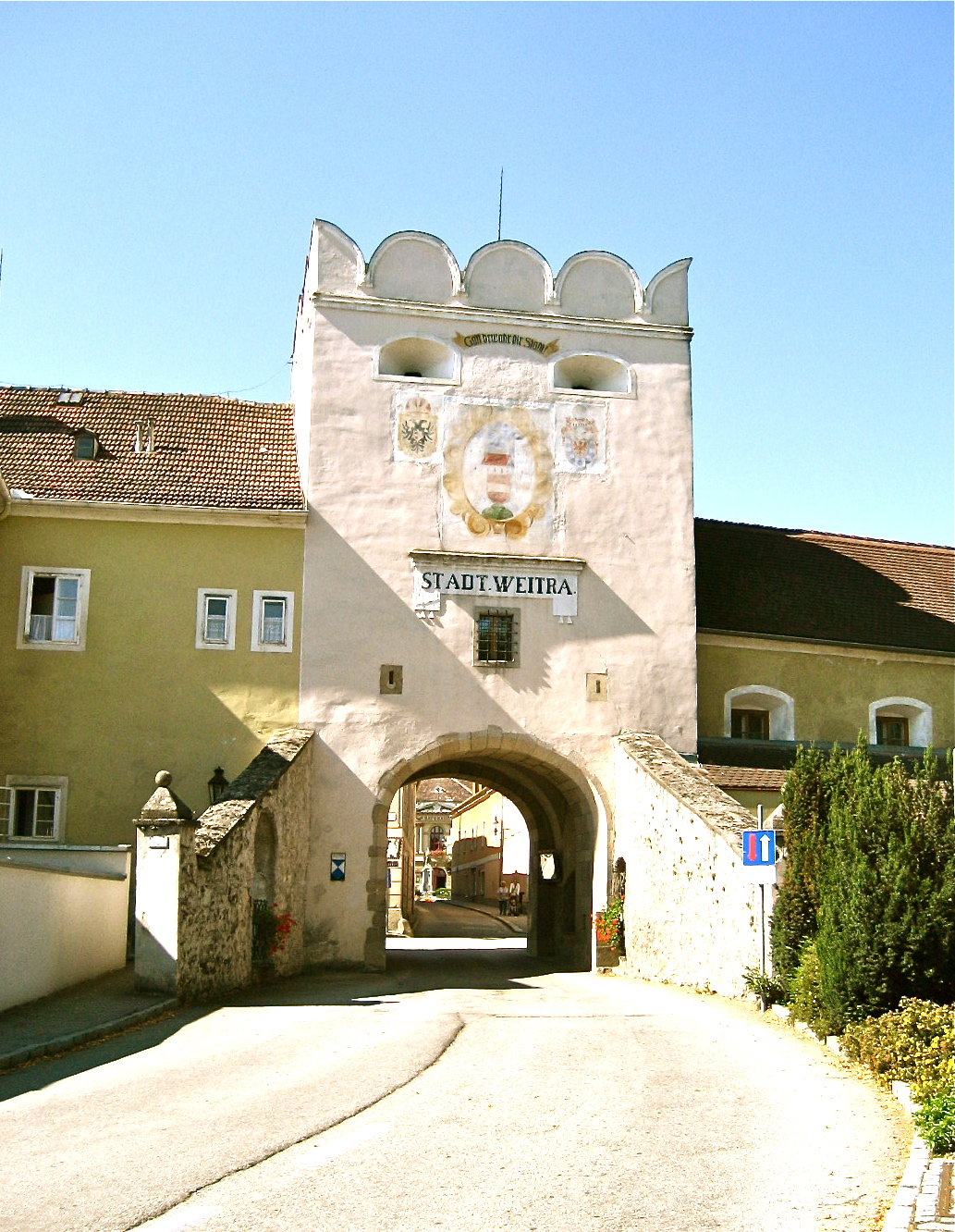
Oberetor Weitra

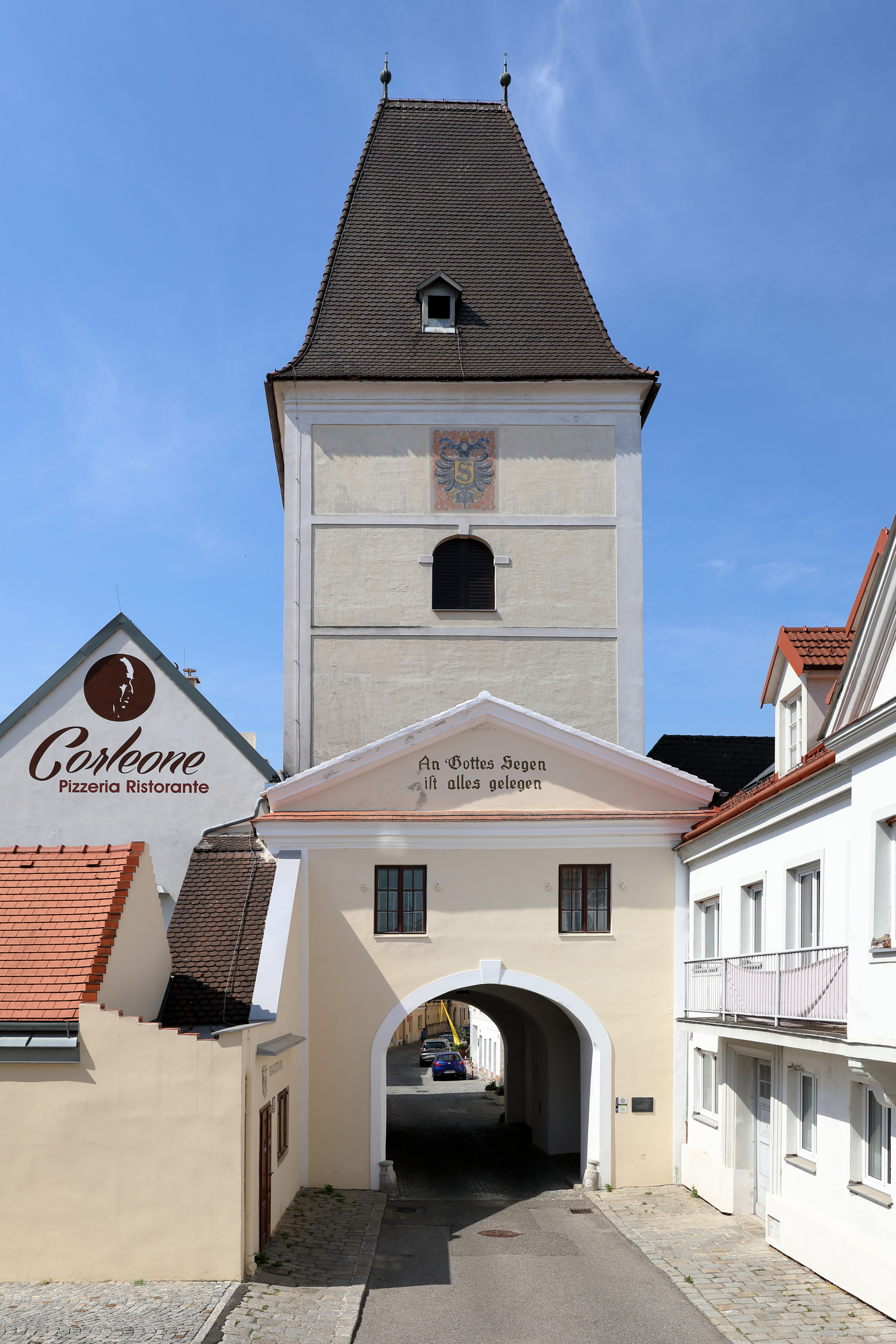
City Gate at Stein by Krems

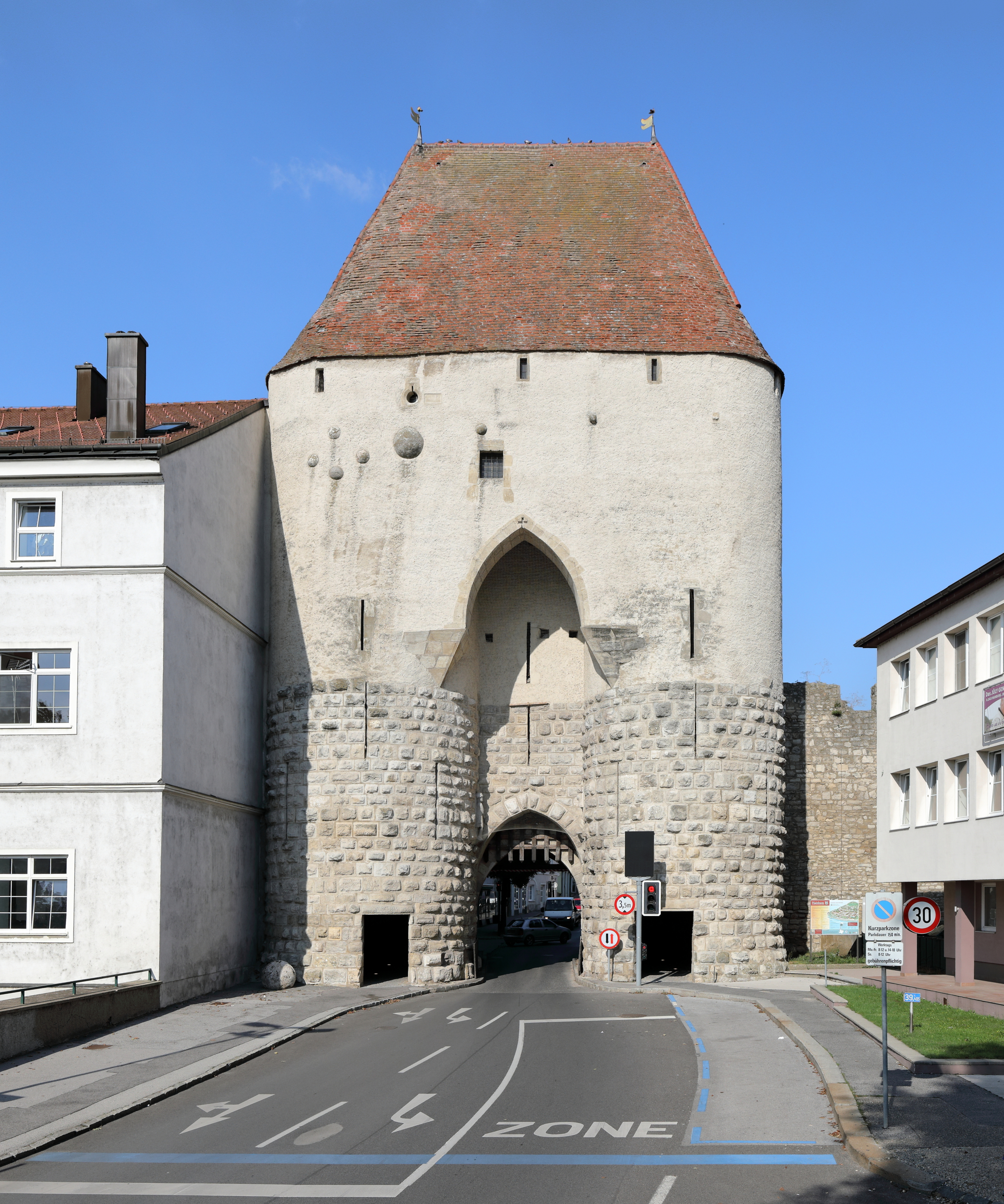
Hainburg 'Wienertor' in 2018

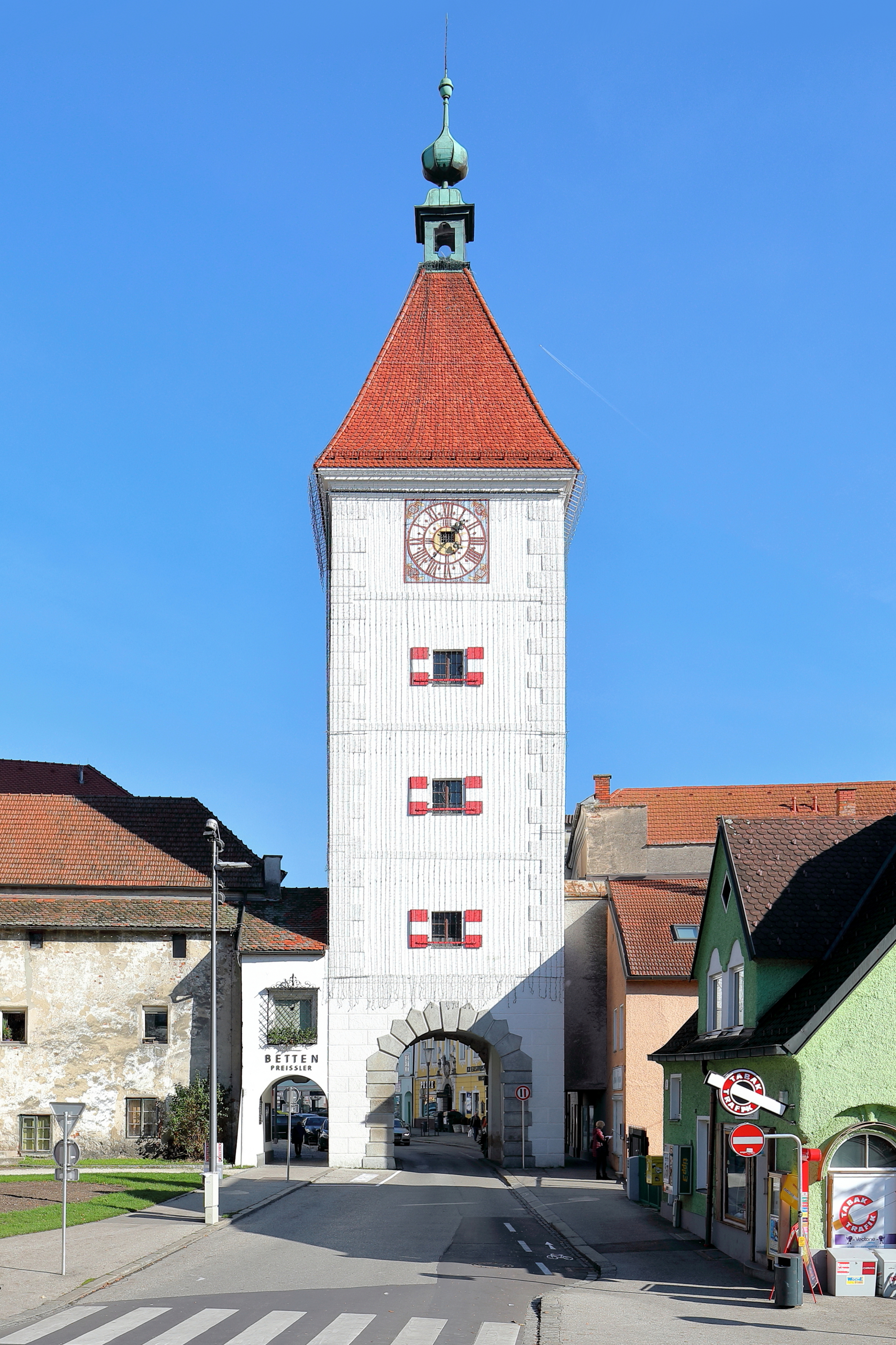
Wels City Gate

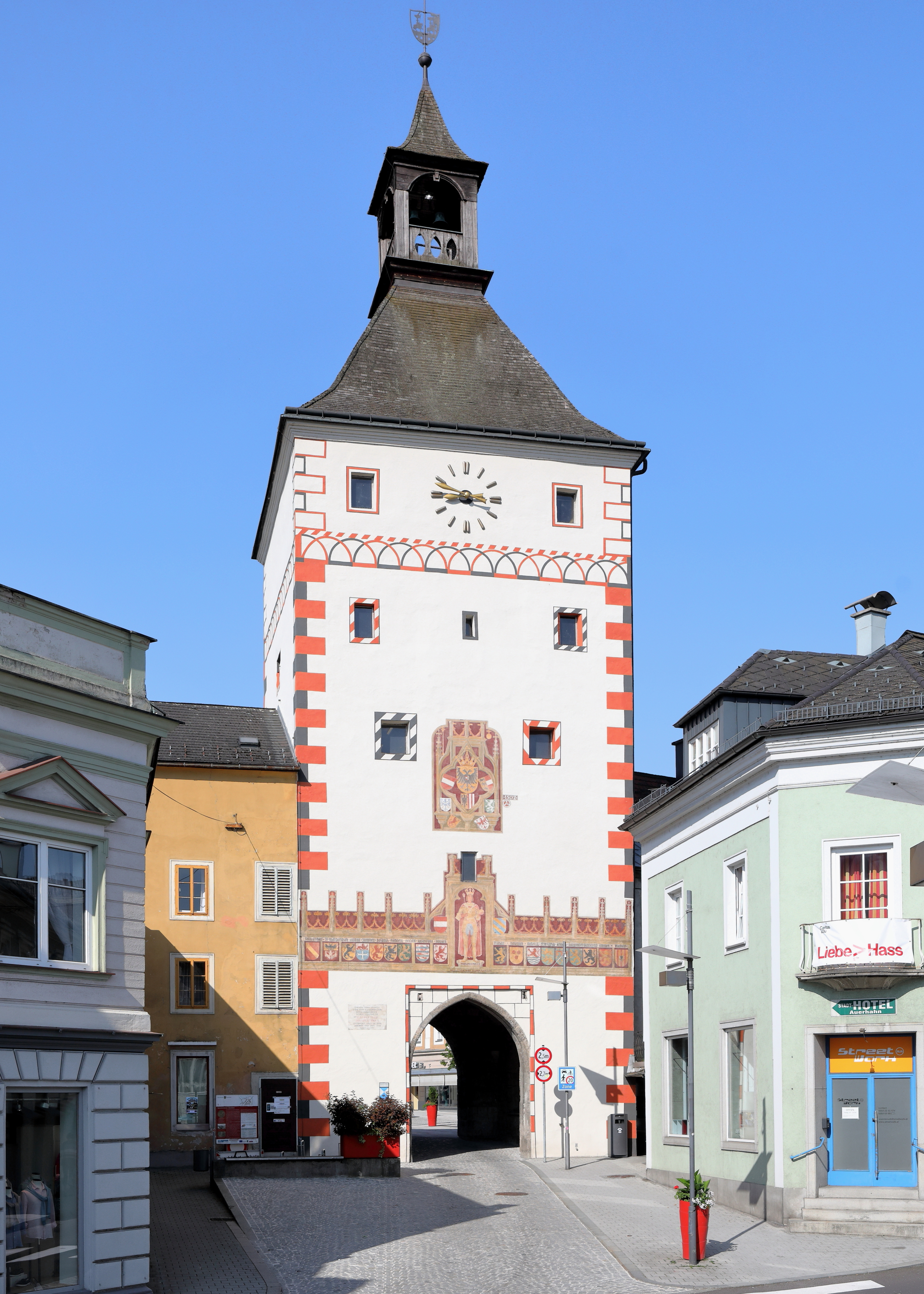
Vöcklabruck Unterer Stadtturm

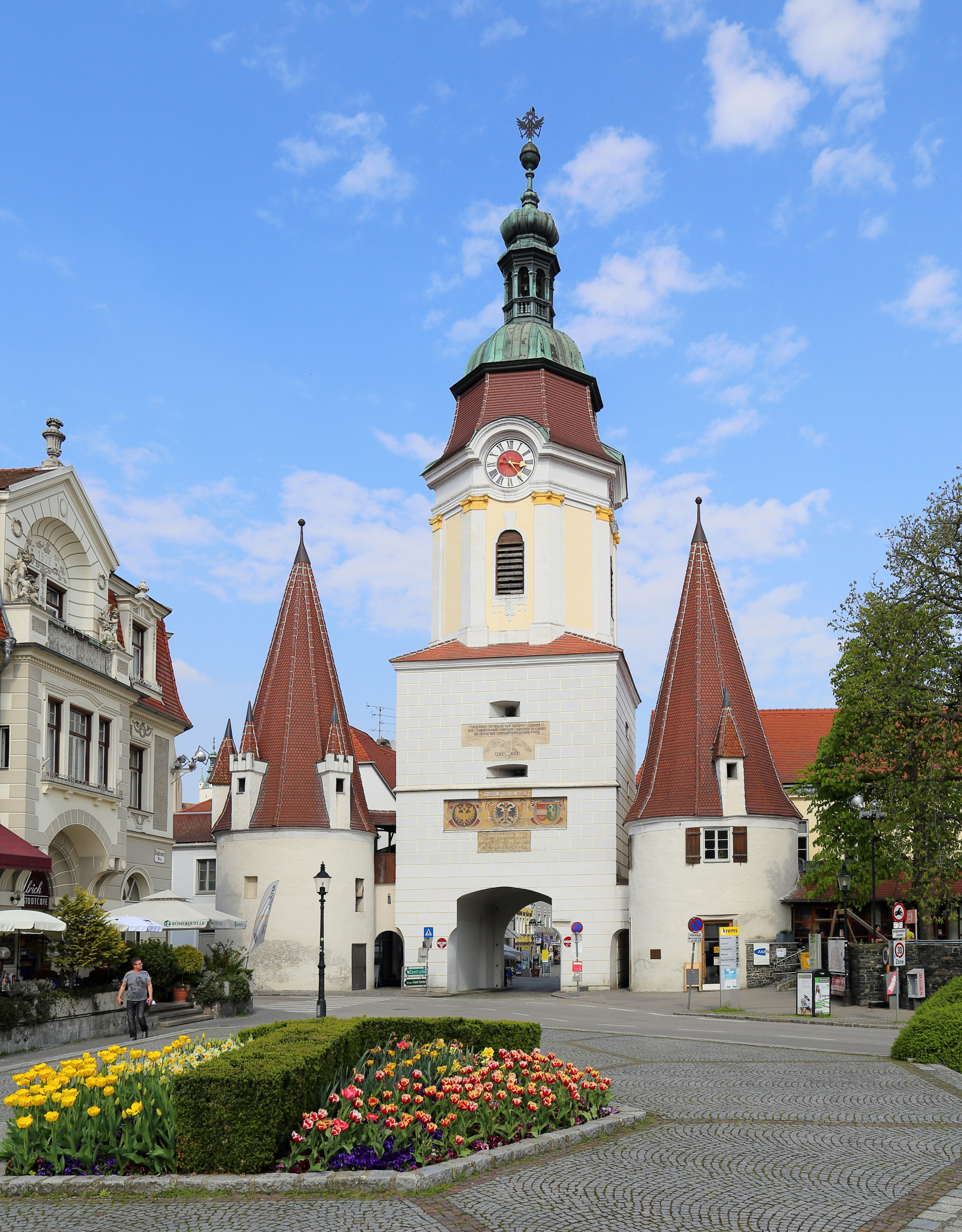
The Krems Steiner Tor. The upper part of the central tower and cupola were added in the Baroque period.

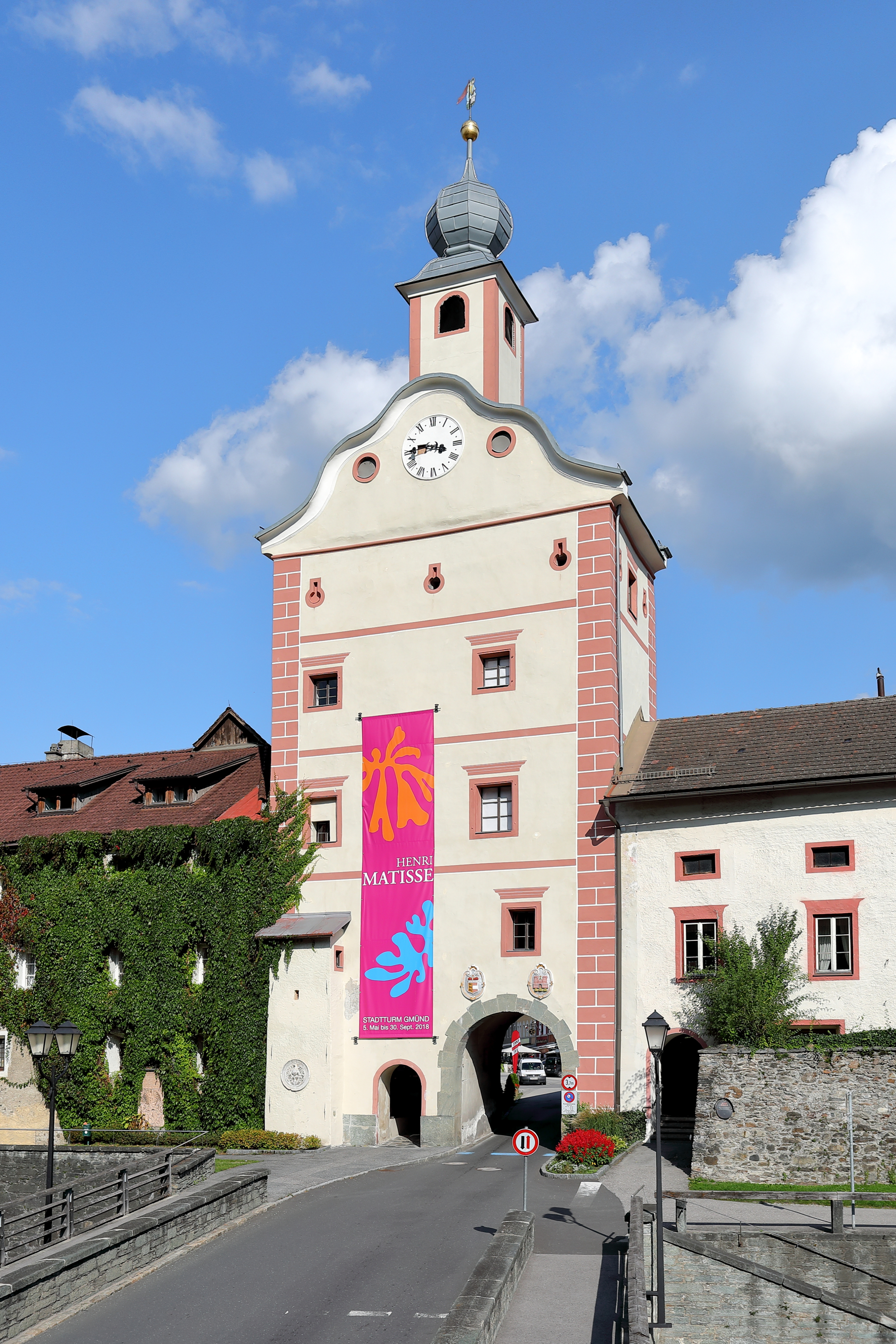
Gmünd -Baroque 'Unteres Tor'

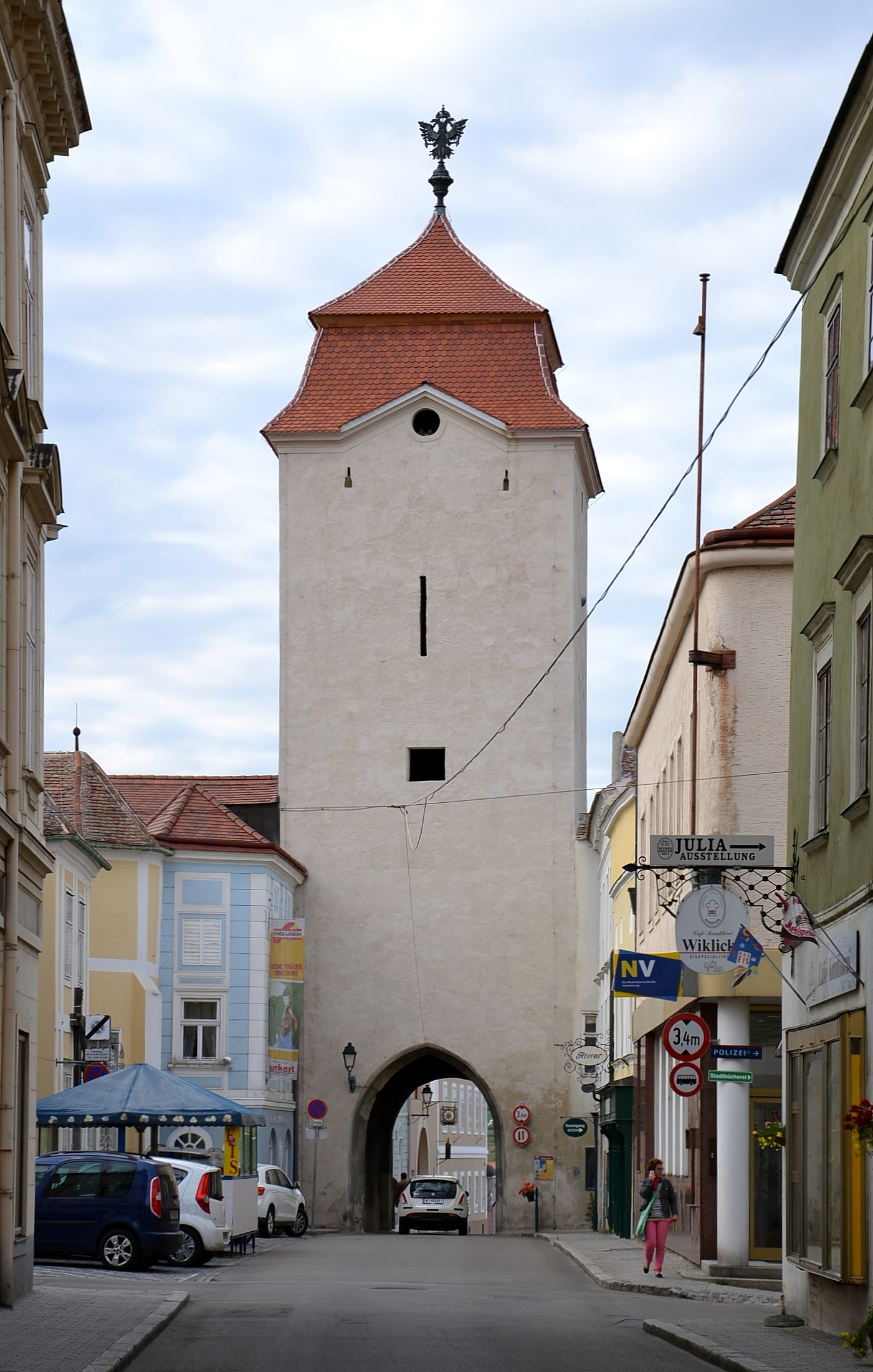
Retz Znaimertor Gatetower

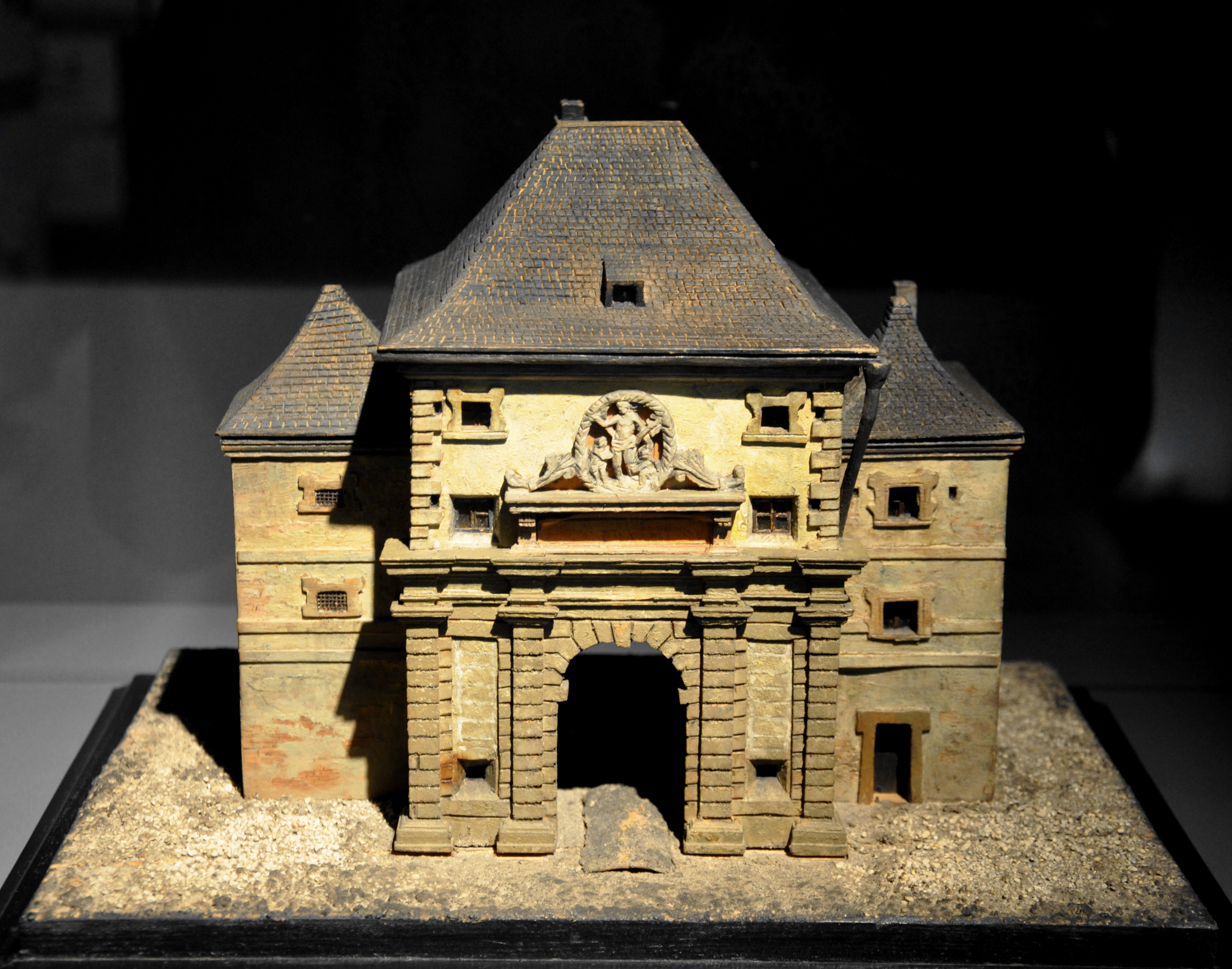
Model of 1895 of the demolished Linzer Tor in Salzburg Museum.

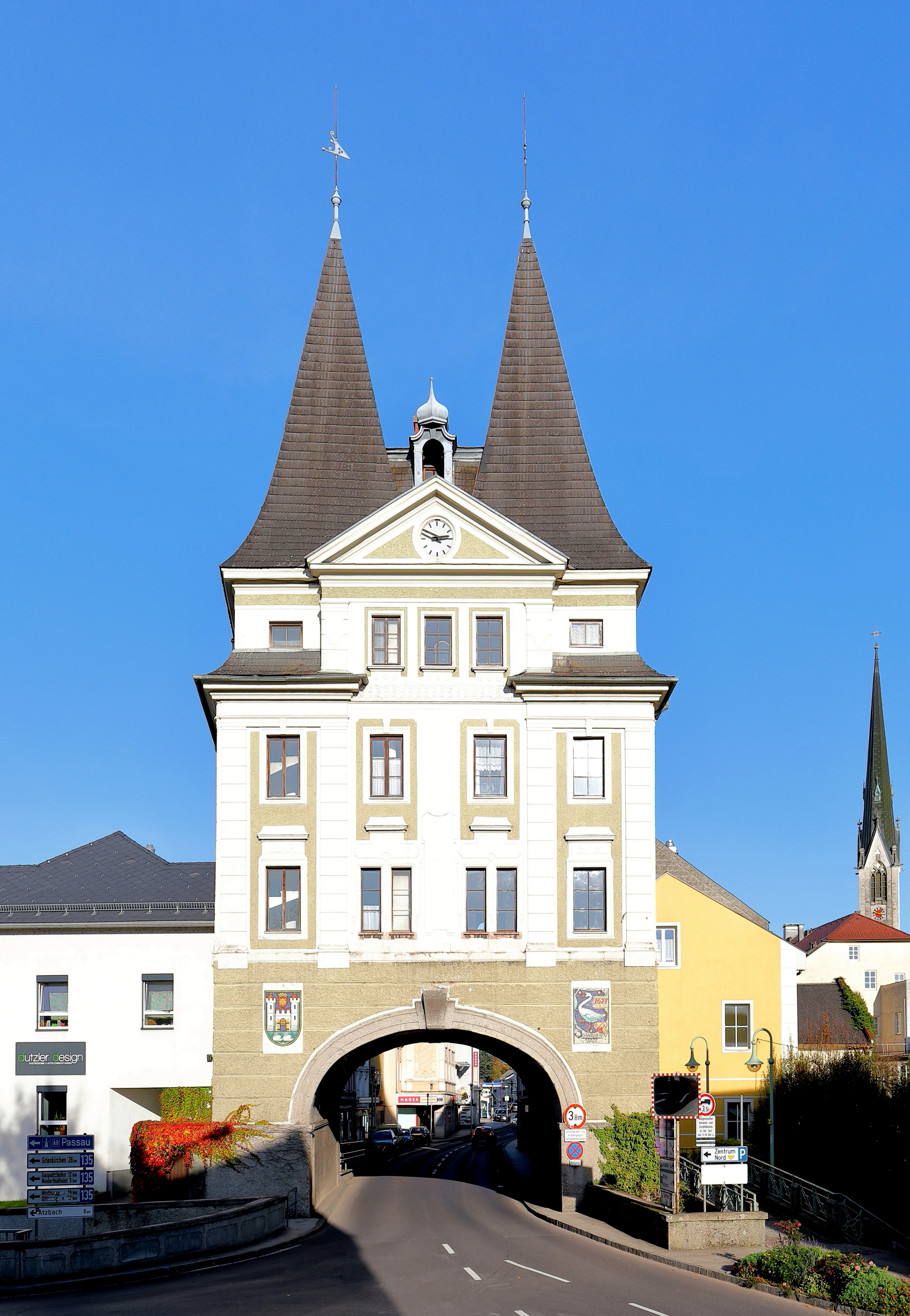
Schwanenstadt. Re-modelled late 17th–18th century gate tower

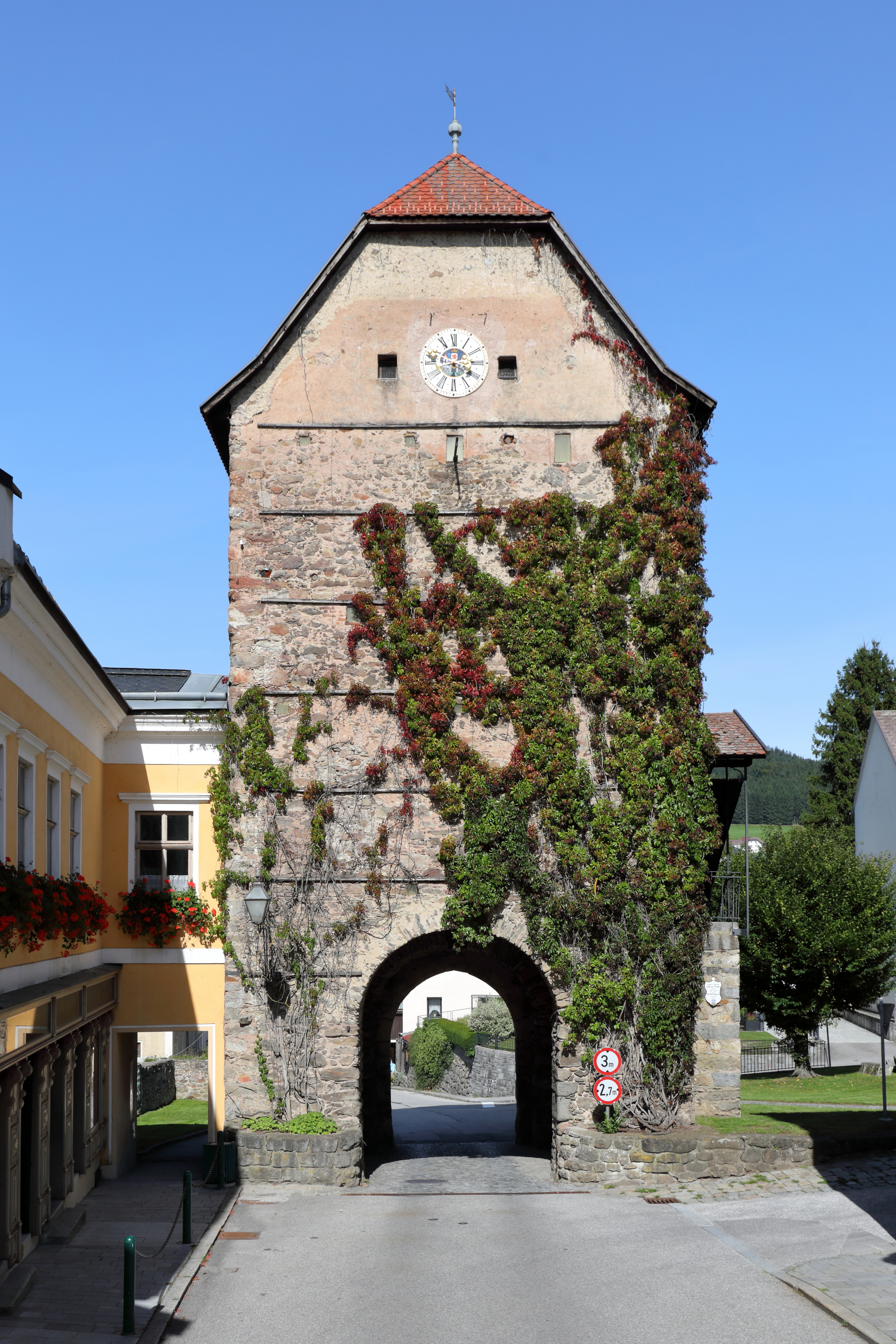
Gate tower at Haslach an der Mühl; build 1487

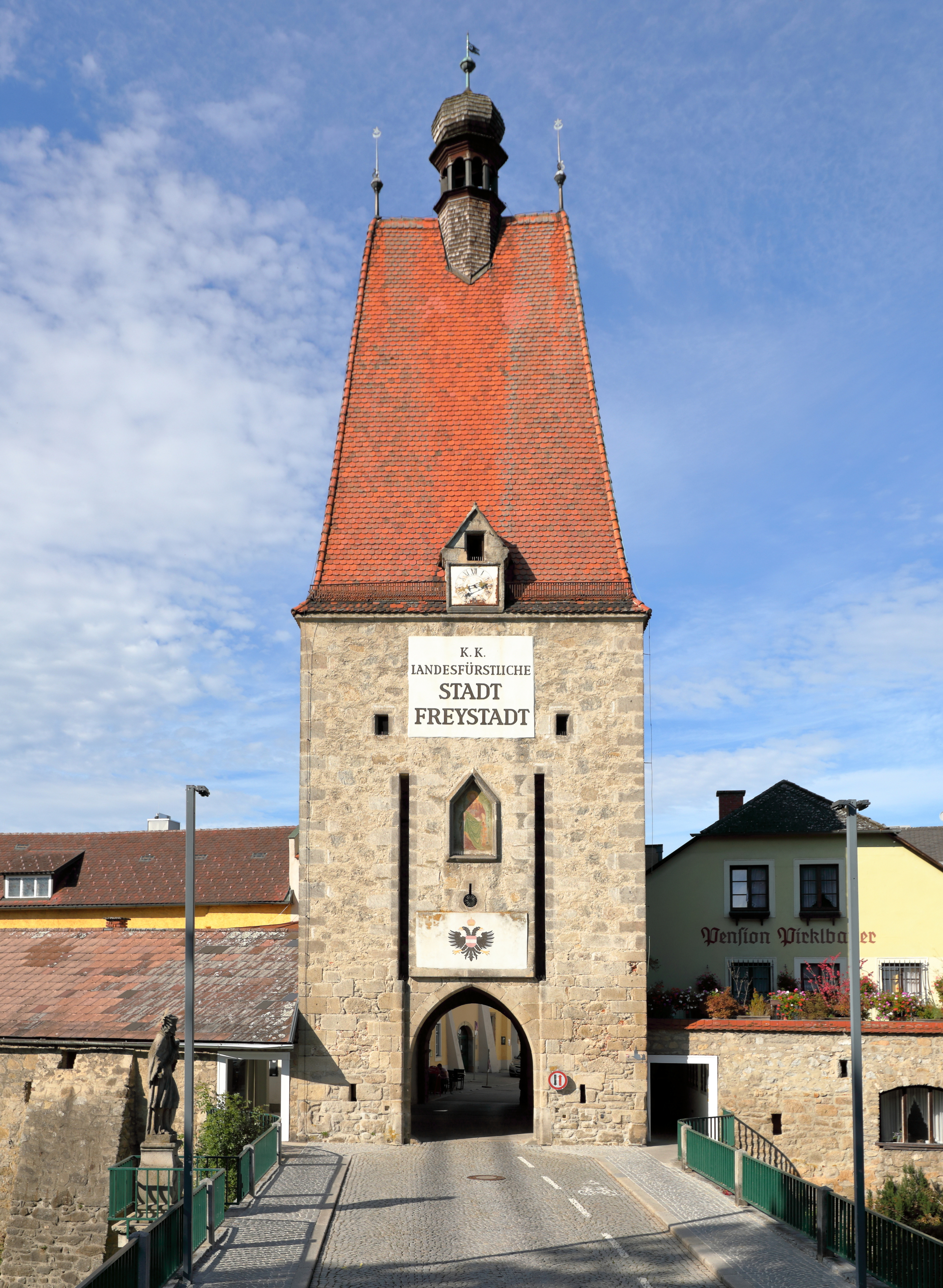
Gate tower at Freistadt

Later gates in the 16th century were built to impress. At Krems, the Emperor Maximillian built an elaborate barbican gate directly in front of the old city gate, though the upper part of the tower is 18th century. The Prince-Bishop of Salzburg employed the Italian architect and military engineer Santini to rebuild the gates such as the Linzer Tor at Salzburg, in a classical style. Similar classical gates were built at Klagenfurt and Vienna, but have now been demolished. Elsewhere more massive early Baroque gates, such as Gmünd, or with double carriageways as at Gmünden, were constructed. In the later 18th century, during the Napoleonic Wars and until about 1890, there was widespread destruction of gates to ease the flow of traffic. As a result, there are fewer good examples of surviving gates in Austria, than elsewhere in central Europe.

=== Wall towers (Turm) ===
- Demi-lune bastions or tower – These ‘half-moon’ towers were either added or incorporated into walls in the 13th or early 14th centuries, probably for accommodation of archers, to cover fire for moat and to prevent the wall being undermined. They appear to predate the use of artillery. The example from Scharding is likely to date the construction of the walls around 1316.
- Rectangular towers – These were an alternative to the demi-lune towers. They were often built to a considerable height and spaced evenly around the defensive circuit. They figure extensively on early prints, but rarely now survive to anything like their original height.
- Round towers – The use of round towers as wall towers is probably contemporary with rectangle towers and may be mixed with rectangle towers as at St Pölten. There are many 'stadt' with right angle corners to the walls where round towers are used.
- D-shaped towers – These were developed after the introduction of artillery and protrude further from the wall and grow in height
- Hexagonal towers – These are towers with five faces facing forward and the sixth face against the wall. They appear around 1480 and were added to existing walls to mount light artillery. Examples are the Antonturn at Zwettl and at Drosendorf and Waidhofen an der Thaya.
- Pulverturm is a term that is used for a tower that was used for storing gunpowder. Towers of different shapes are referred to as ‘pulverturm’ and it is likely that most of these towers were used for this purpose from the 16th century onwards, rather than during the medieval period.
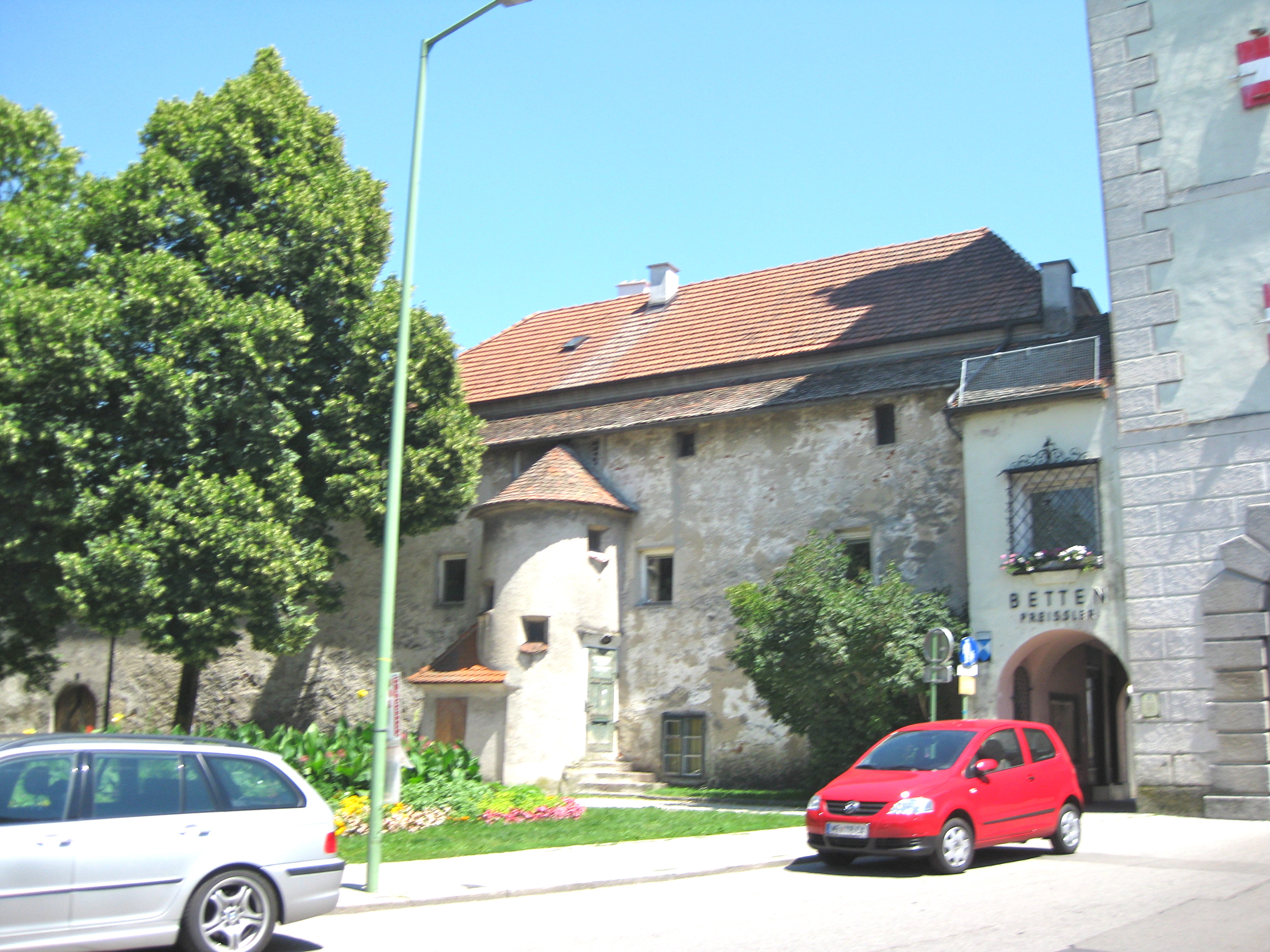
City wall next to gate-tower at Wels with early semi-lune tower.

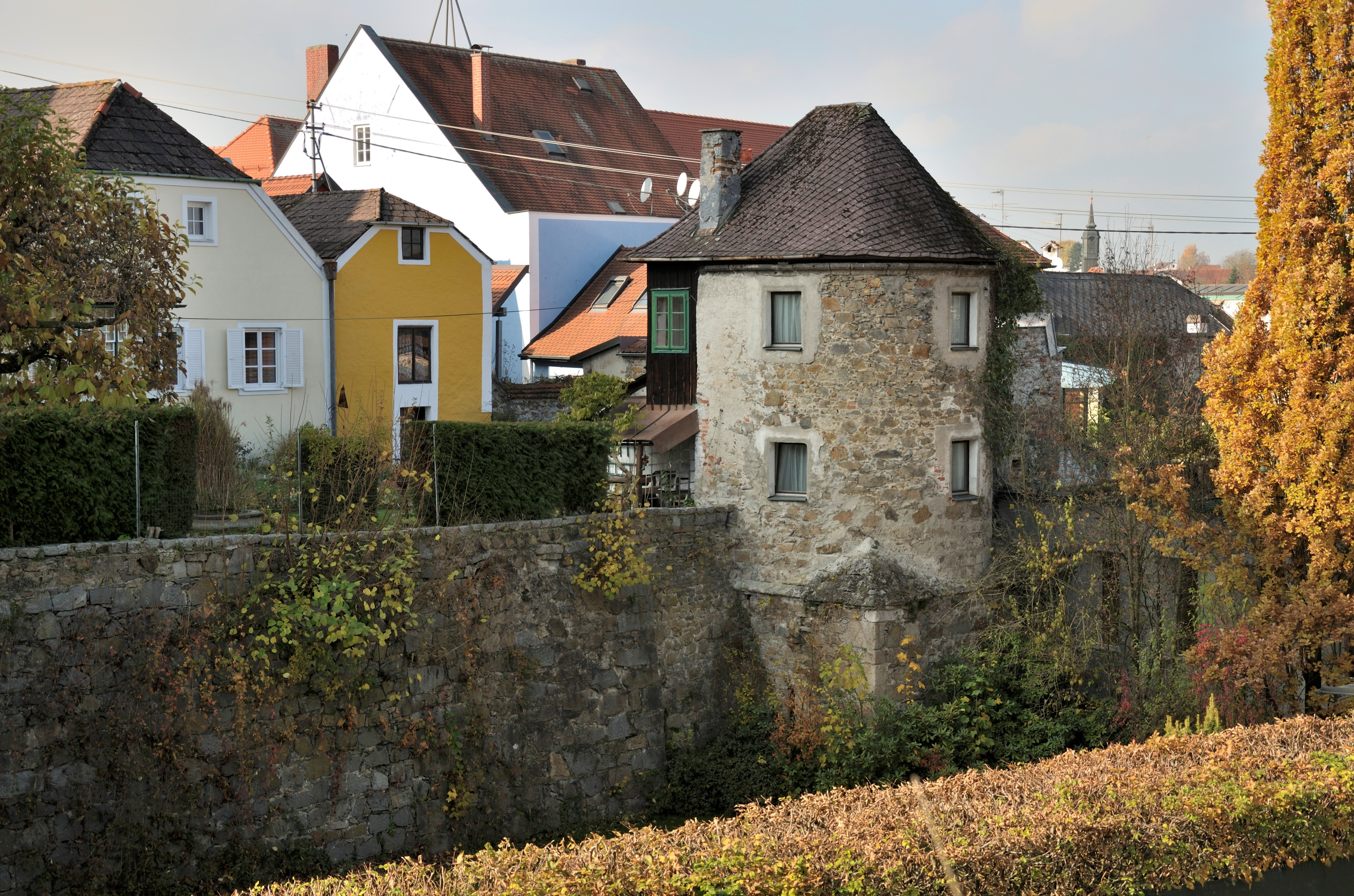
Schärding Kirchengasse, D-shaped tower.

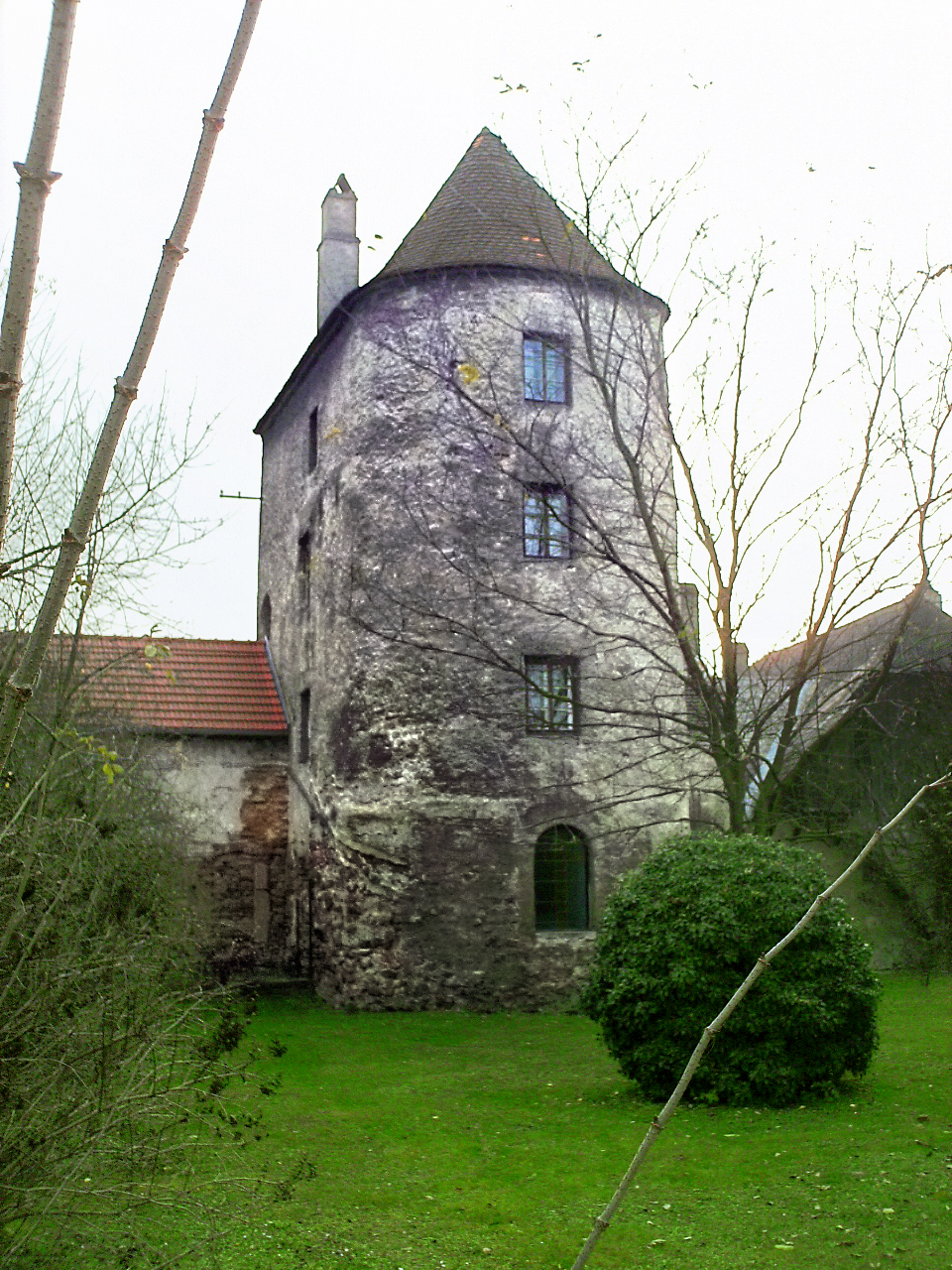
Reck or Hungerturm at Traismauer, D-shaped tower or bastion.

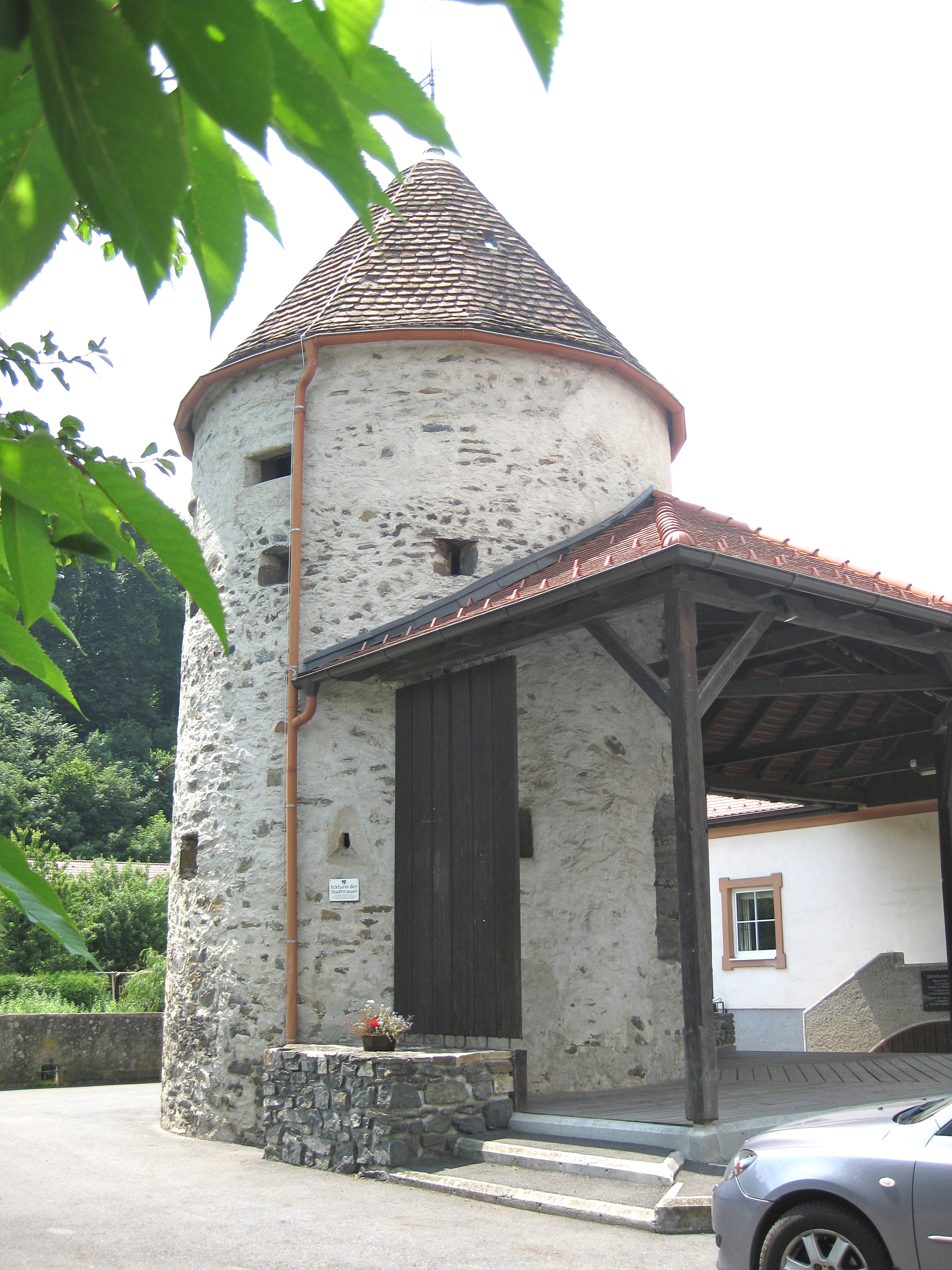
Raabs an der Thaya round tower.

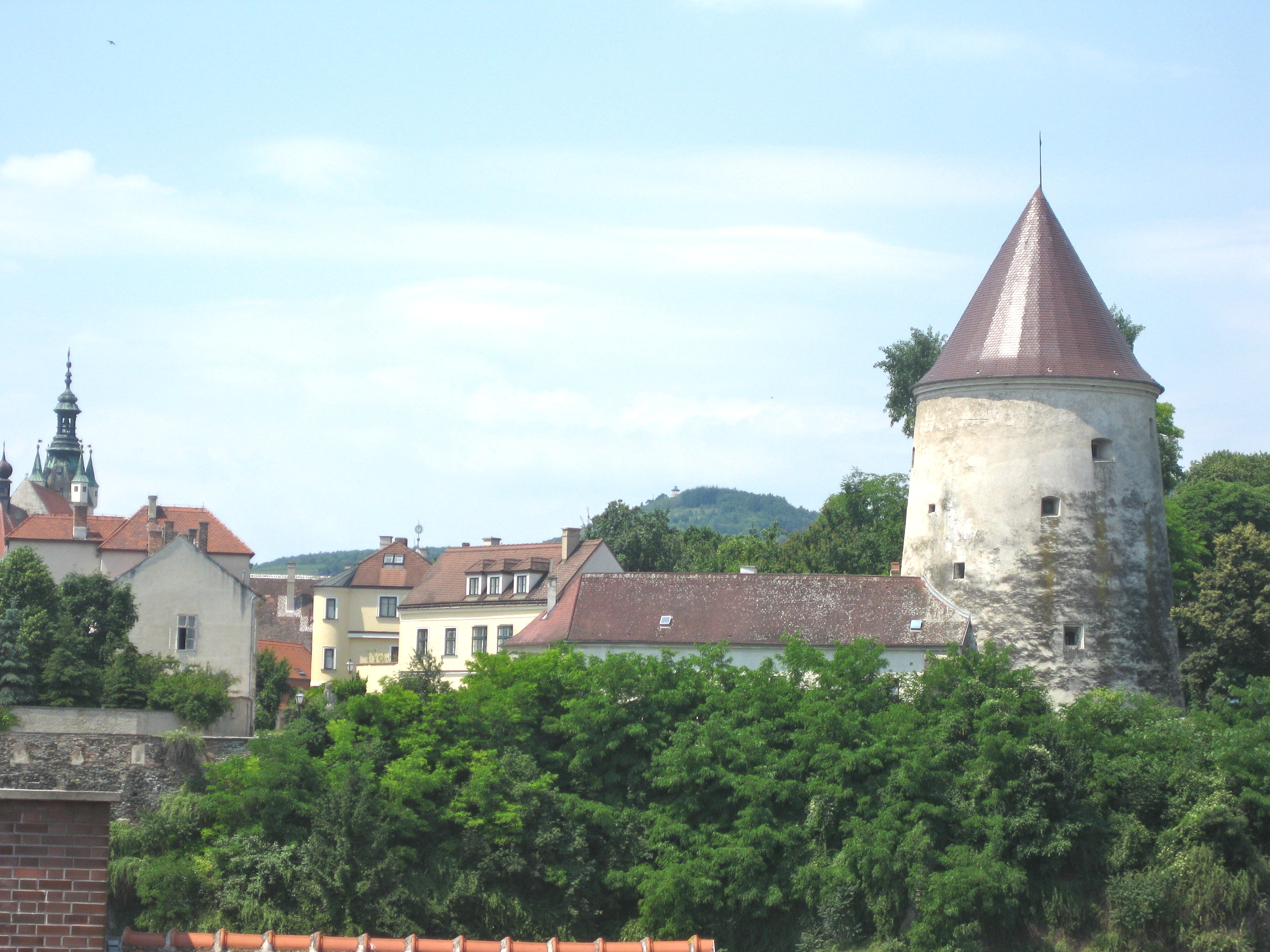
Krems Pulverturm. Early Roundel tower.

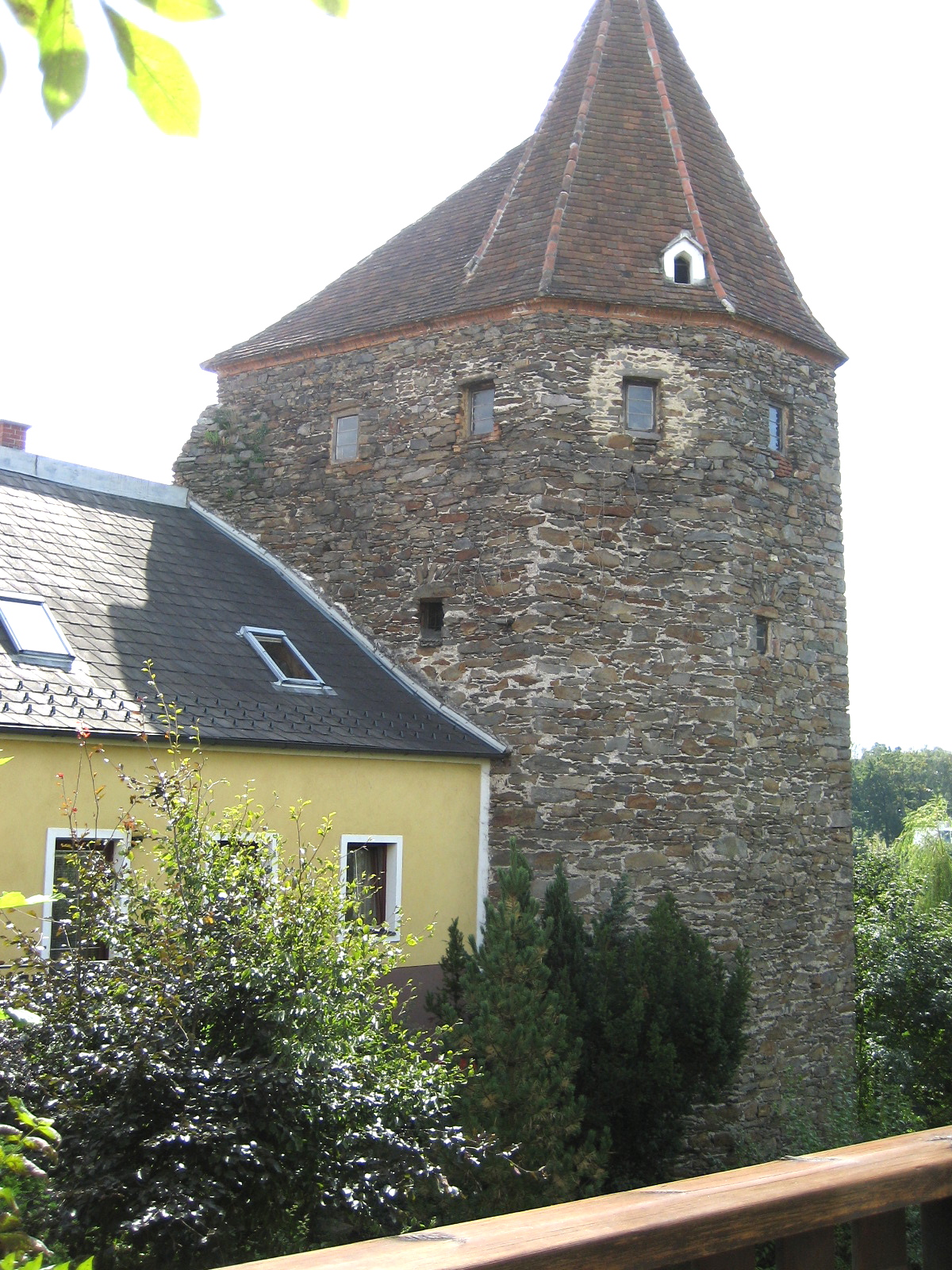
Antonturm, Zwettl - Hexagon Tower.

=== Watchtowers (Wachturm) ===
These tend to be a feature of the later 15th and 16th century. In some stadt, tall and impressive watch towers were built either in or adjacent to the marketplace. A watchman would be employed continuously to survey the town walls and the surrounding countryside. Churches and the tall towers of the defences could also be permanent watch towers. Examples of these watchtowers are at Enns, 1554–68; Retz, where the tower is adjacent to the Rathaus; and Innsbruck of 1358.

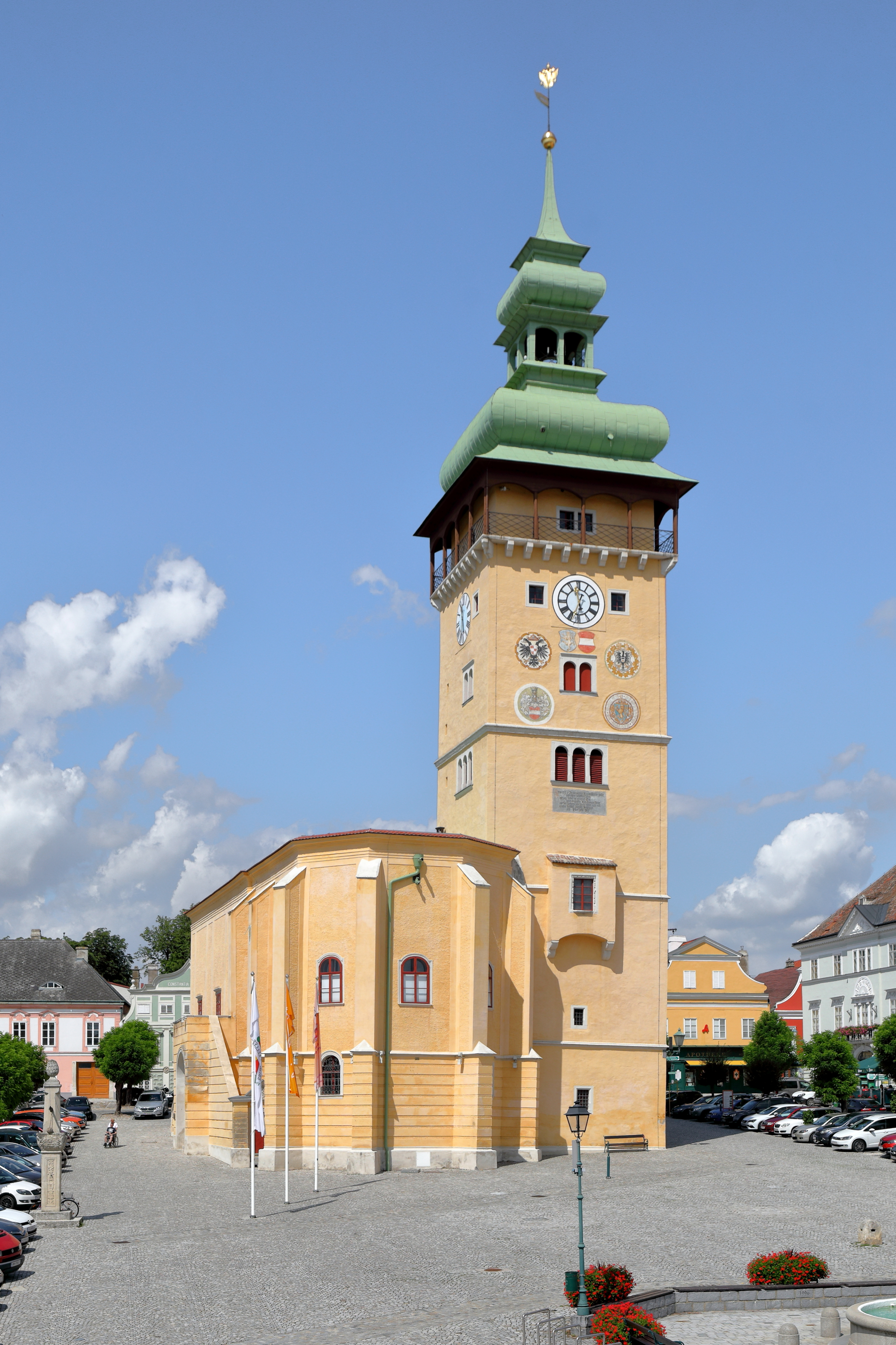
Retz - town hall at main square.

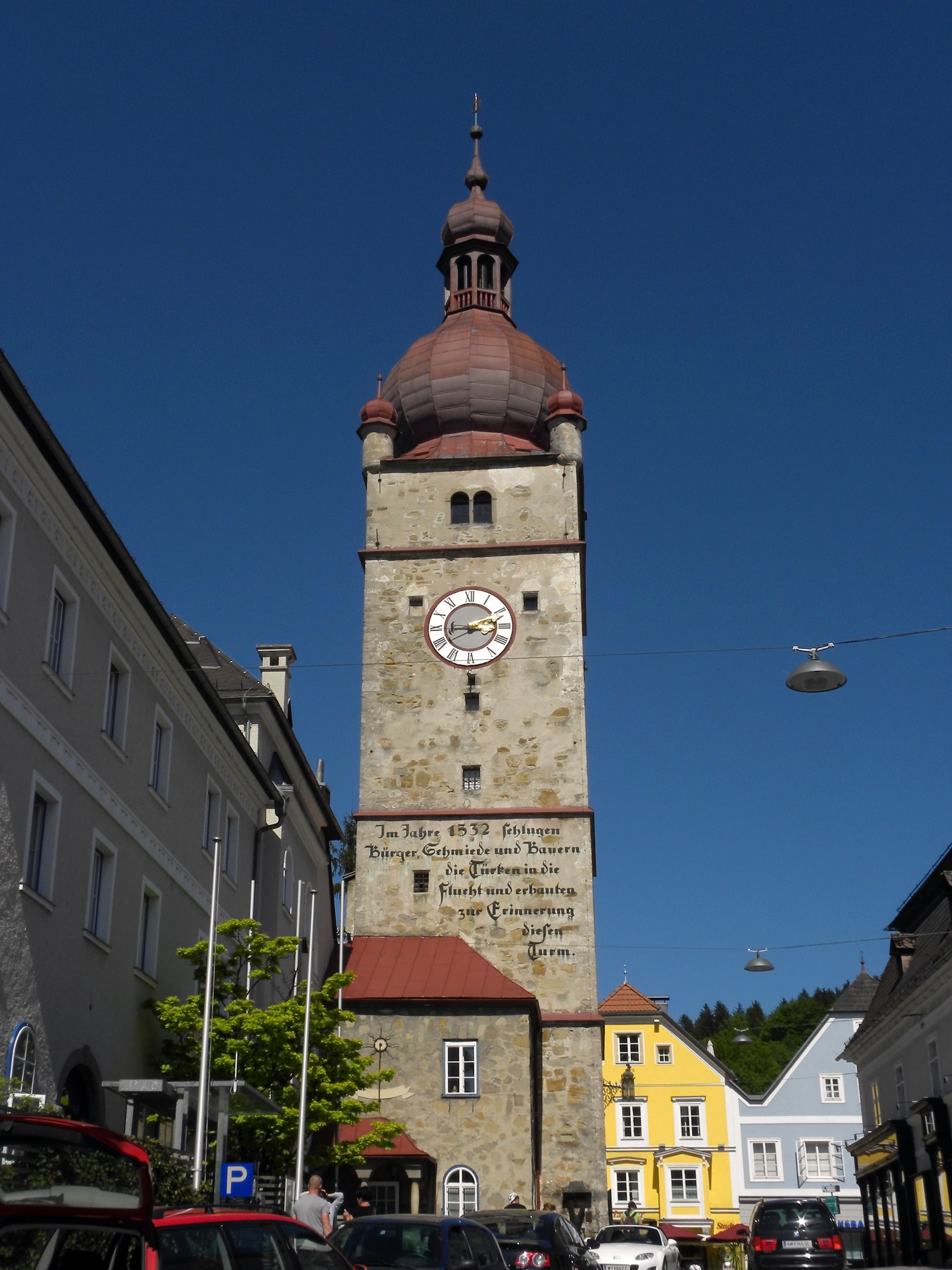
Waidhofen an der Ybbs - city tower.

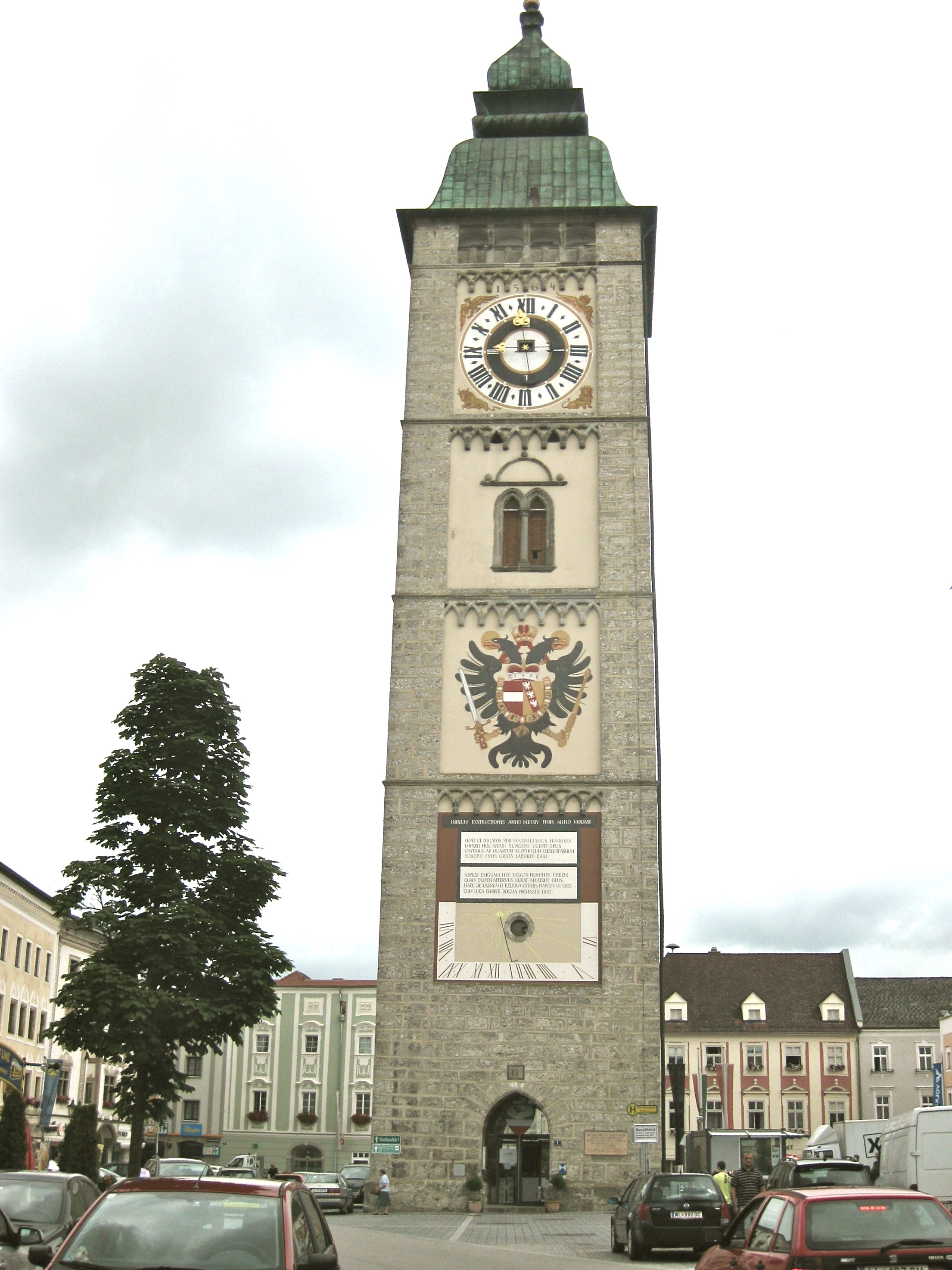
Enns Stadtturm.

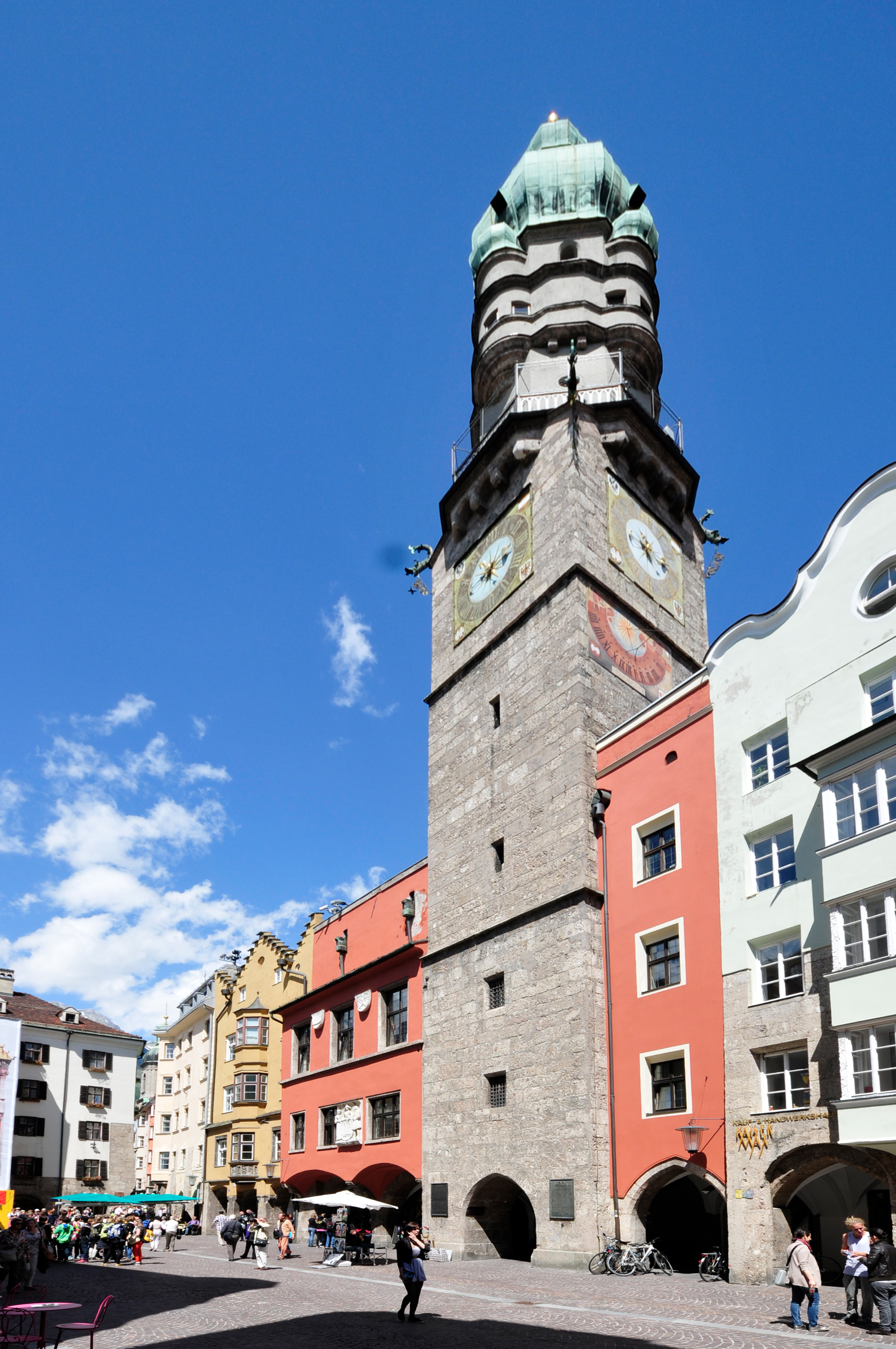
Stadtturm at Innsbruck- lower portion 1358, next to marketplace.

== Artillery and modification (14th–15th century) ==
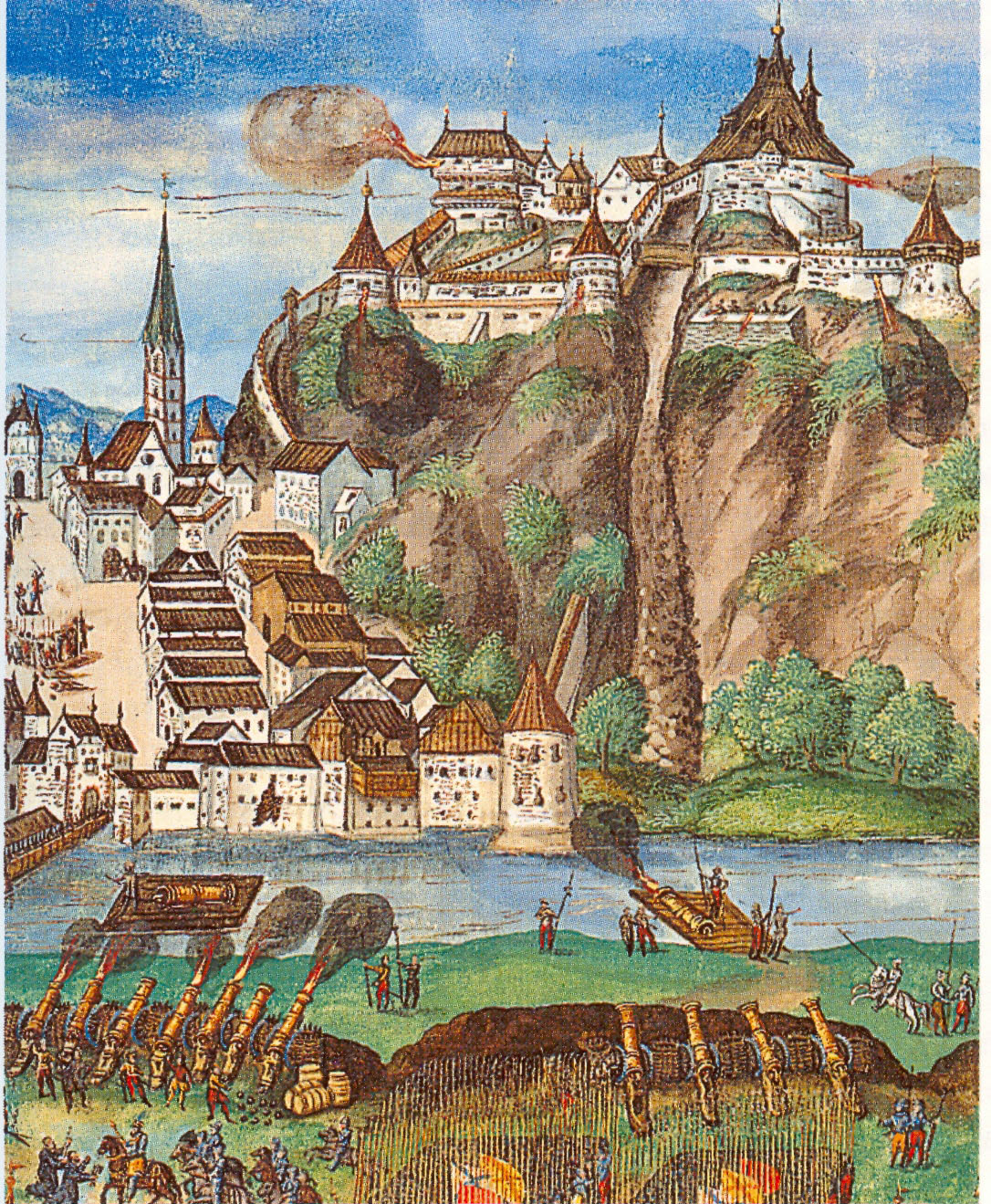
Siege of Kufstein in 1504.

In the 14th and 15th centuries, modification were made to the town walls of many towns with the introduction of gun ports and the addition of further wall with square towers or bastions on the outer side of the surrounding ditch. The siege of Krems in 1477 by Matthew Corvinus was one of the first times that cannon were effectively used to batter down a town wall. This incident seems to have resulted in many of the Austria town walls being strengthened or re-designed. The siege of Kufstein by Emperor Maximilian in 1504, who floated his Artillery Train down the river Inn exposed the weakness of having fortified houses along a river bank as part of the wall.

With the development of wall towers for mounting artillery, it was necessary to construct them with open backs or "Schalenturm", as the fumes from the gunpowder needed to be dispersed. One or more strengthened wooden floors would be inserted in the tower to take the often heavy guns. Many open back or 'towers with an open gorge' have subsequently been walled, to make them into usable buildings, but the tower at Friesach is a good example of an open back tower. Some gate-towers were also open-backed. A good example is the Böhmertor at Freistadt in Upper Austria. Here three levels of gun embrasures or openings can be seen, with those at the corner angled to cover the moat. The vertical slits for the drawbridge over the moat can also be seen.

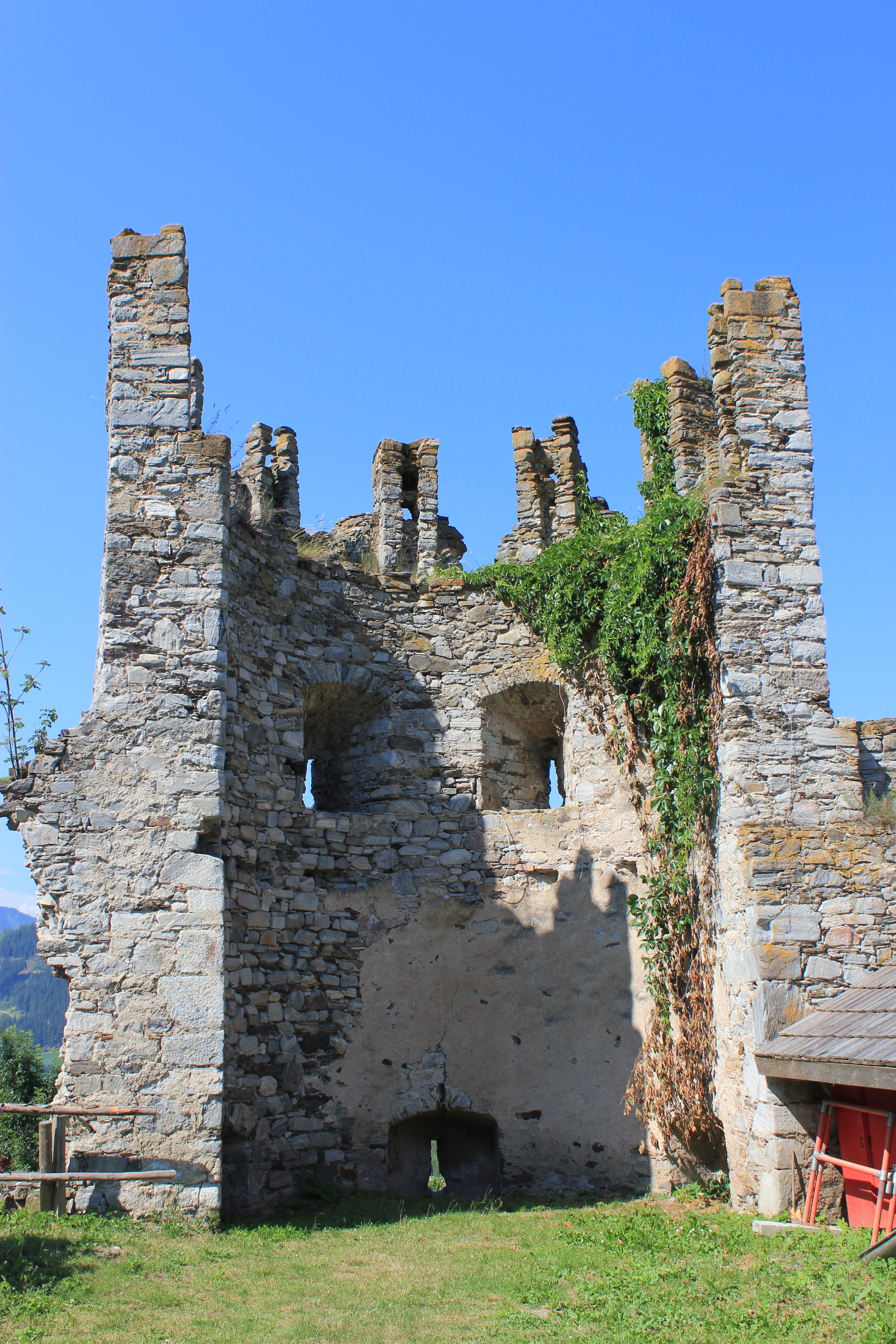
Open back tower at Friesach-Petersberg-Schalenturm.

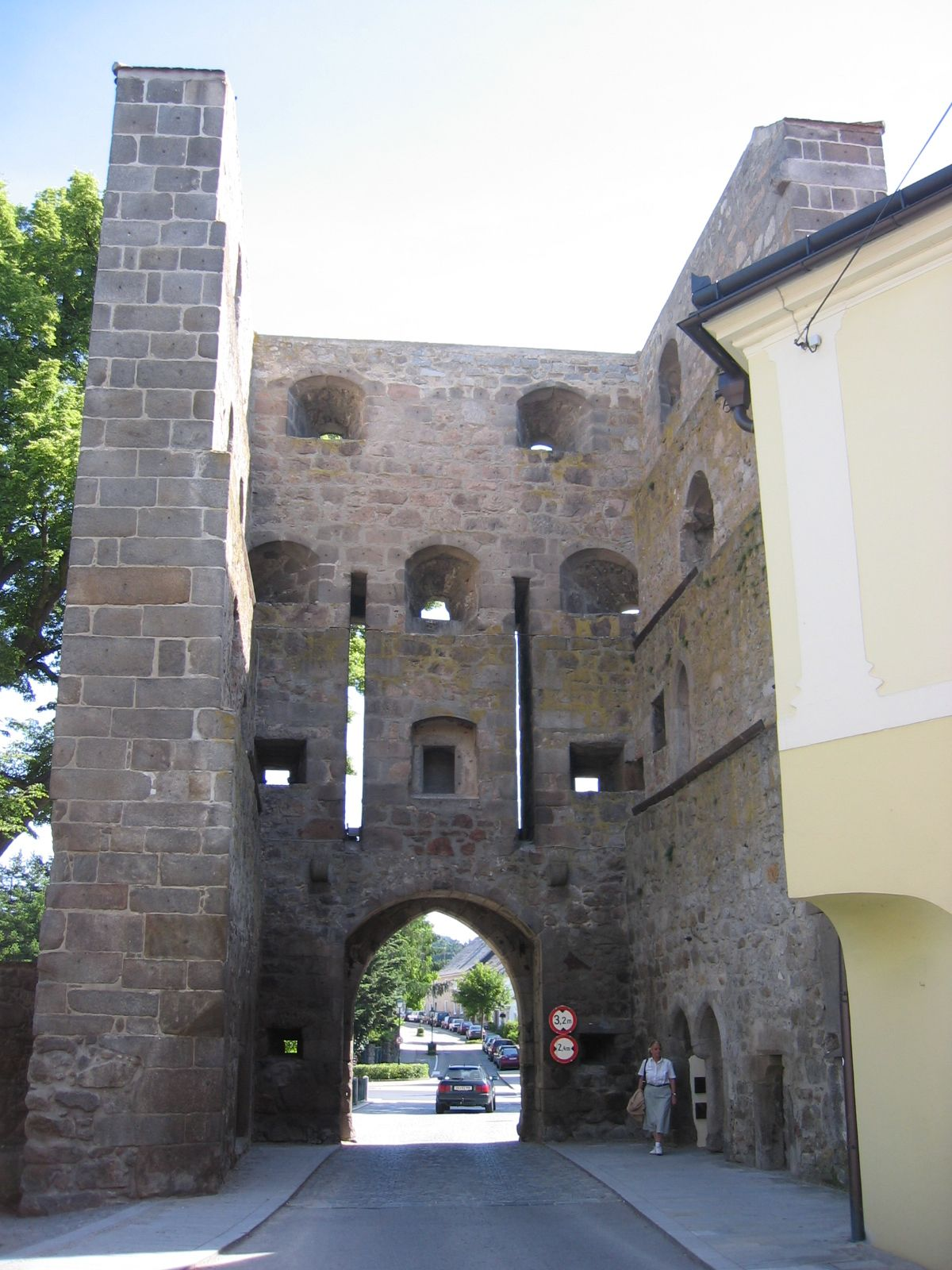
The Böhmertor at Freistadt from the inside, showing gun embrasures.

=== Curtain walls (Kurtine) ===
In Austria (and also at the Hussite towns in Bohemia and Moravia such as Tábor, but especially Jihlava) lower secondary walls (curtain walls) occur surrounding the main wall.

Earth was banked between the two walls to take the impact of cannon fire and this meant that the destructive effect of a cannon being fired at point blank range at the base of the main wall could be avoided. Secondary walls often have round towers set into them to fire on attackers entering the ‘dead’ areas between the walls. Outside the secondary wall there would be a wide moat or ditch and sometimes there would be a further low wall surrounding the moat. In Austria these double circuits are shown on early prints of St Pölten, Krems, Enns, Freistadt, St Veit an Glan, Bruck an der Leitha, Tulln and Vienna. Merian's print of Villach provides a good illustration of multiple walls. At Friesach in Carinthia the double walls still exist on the eastern side and the outer wall is still surrounded by a wide water filled moat.

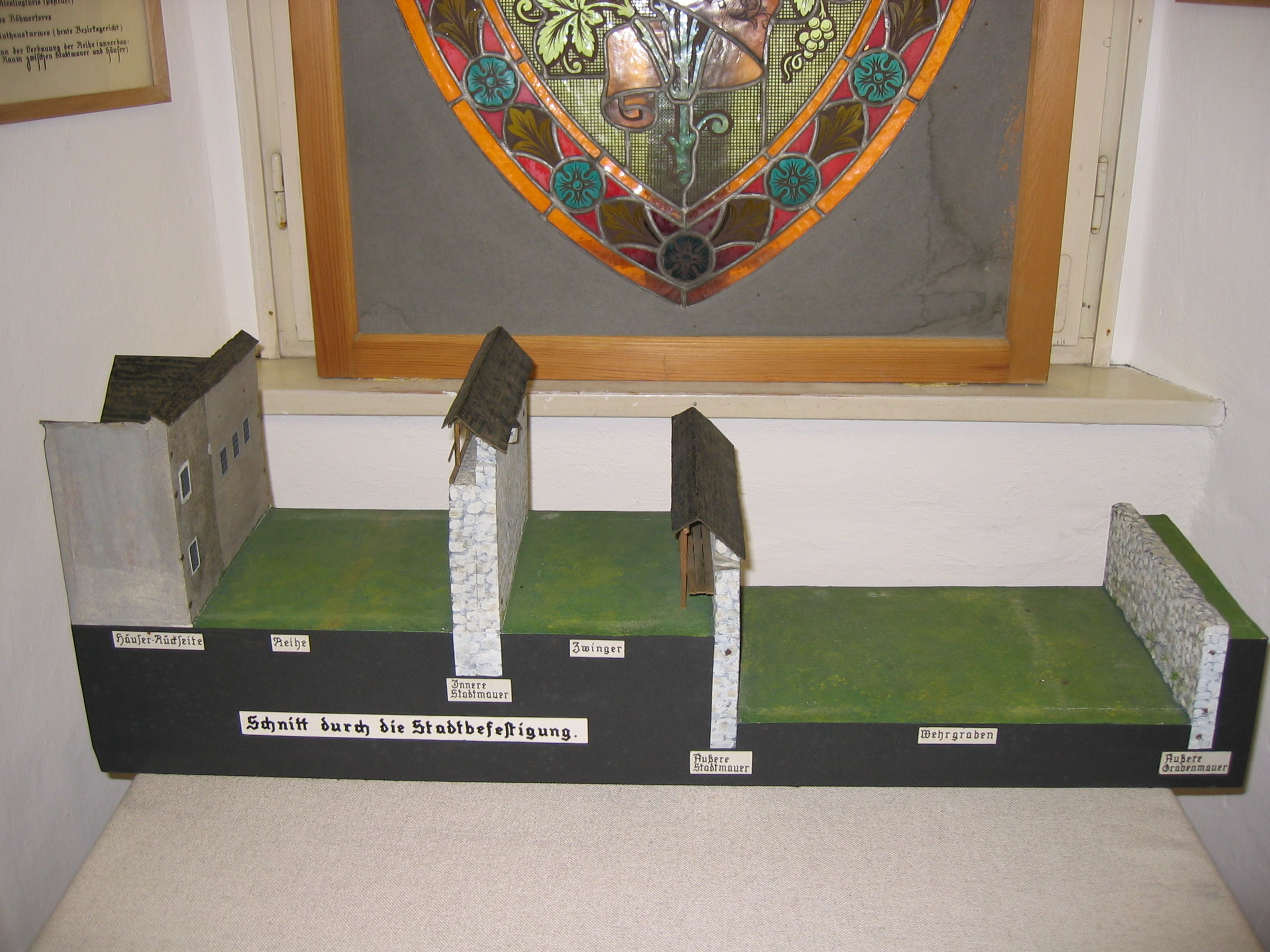
Cross-section of the defences at Freistadt, with the wall, 'mantelmauer' and moat.

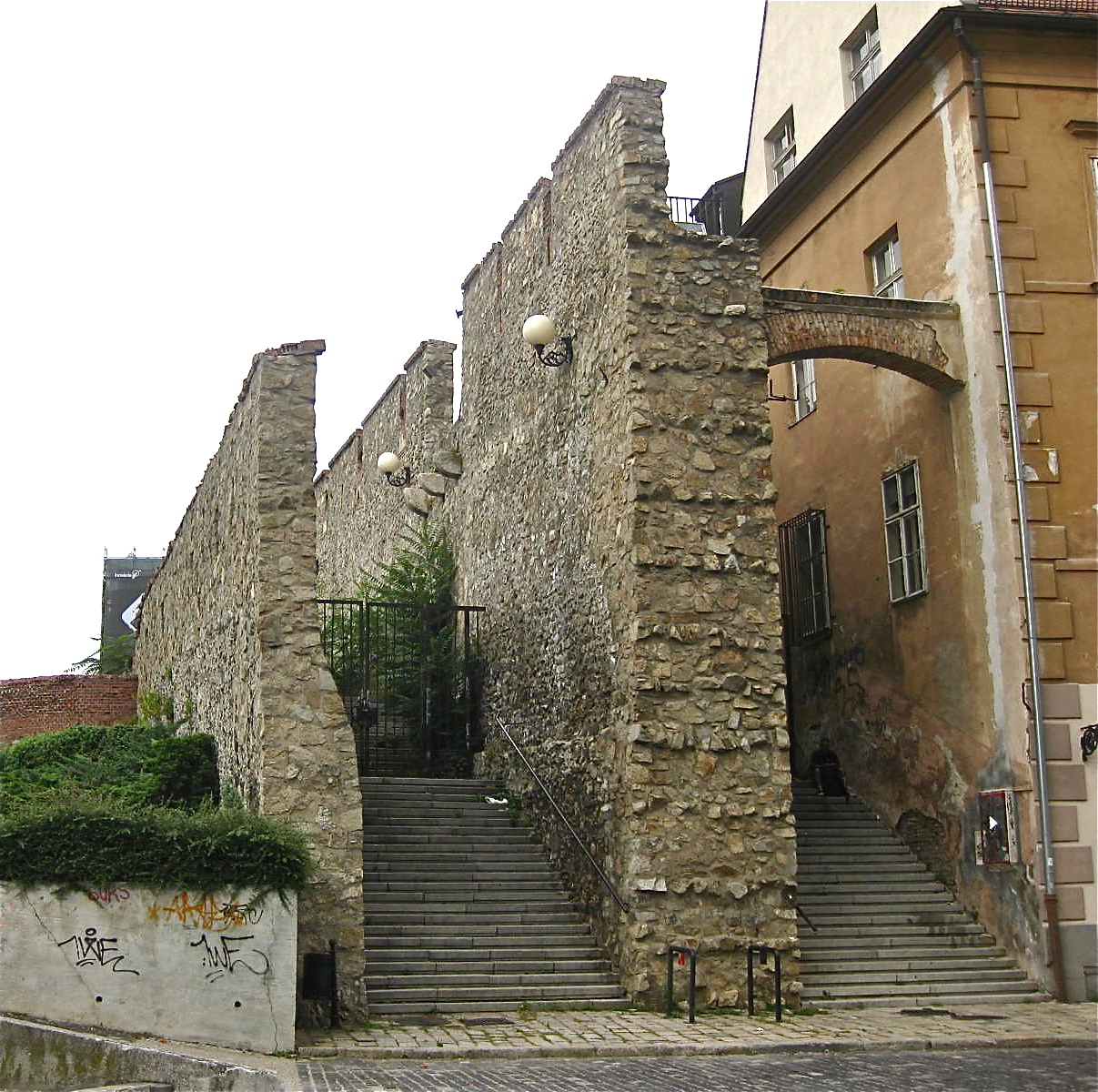
Bratislava town walls. Cross section showing a ‘Mantelmauer’ in front of an earlier wall.

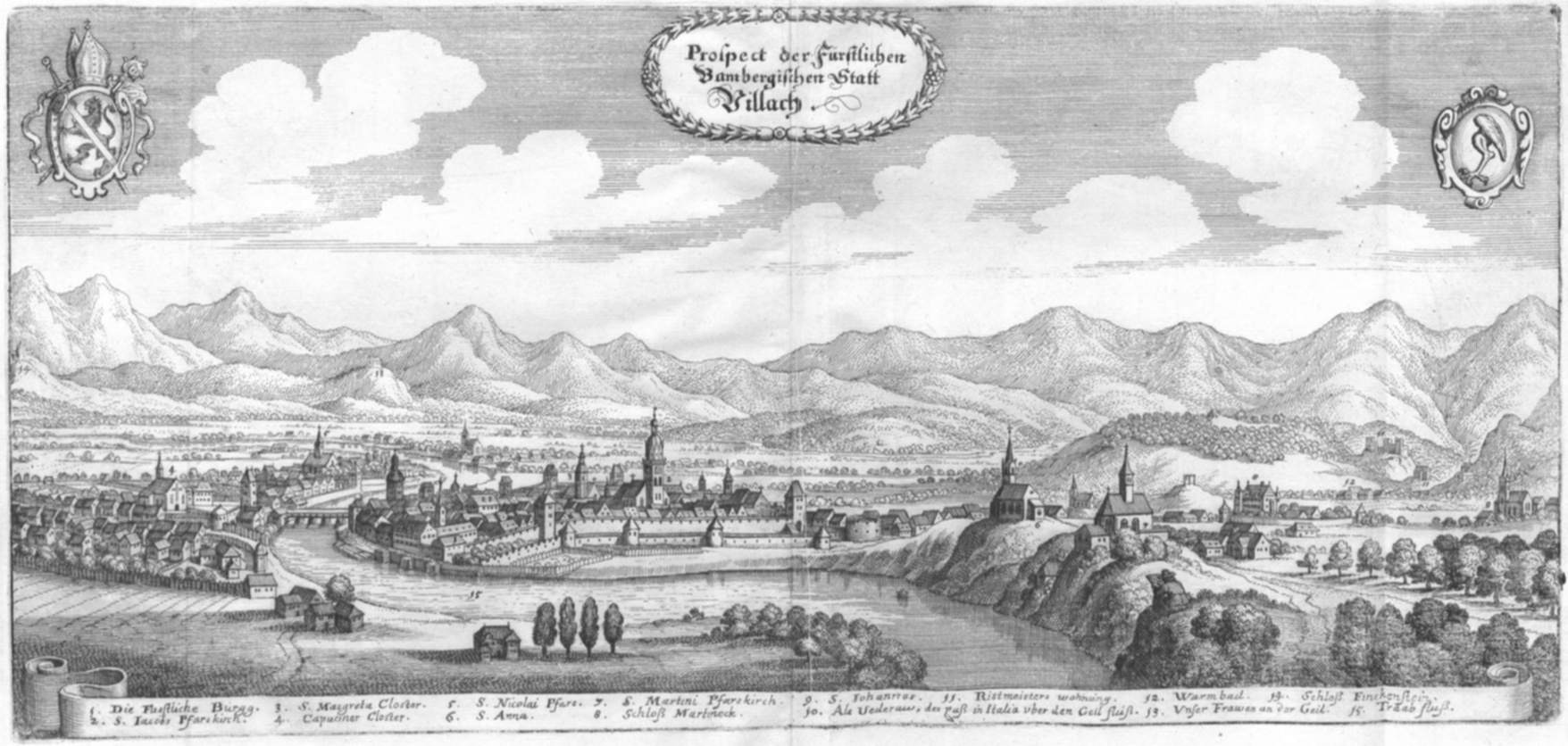
Statt Villach in prospect showing multiple walls. Illustrated by Merian.

== Italian and German defensive systems ==
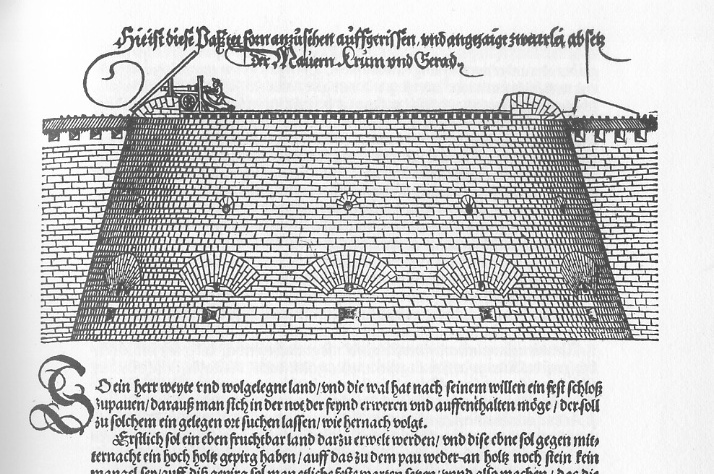
Albrecht Dürer's Roundel Tower 1527.

In the early 16th century, large round blockhouse or ‘roundel’ towers start to be added to some of the town walls in response to the growing Turkish threat (the first siege of Vienna in 1529). These roundels are described in 1527 by the artist and military engineer Albrecht Dürer in treatise on fortification Etliche Underricht zur Befestigung der Stett Schloss und Flecken, published in 1527. The main purpose of these roundels was to act as a platform for cannons, but lower gun-ports also provided gun-loops for smaller artillery pieces. Roundels were normally placed at the corners of walled towns as at Linz and St Veit an Glan.

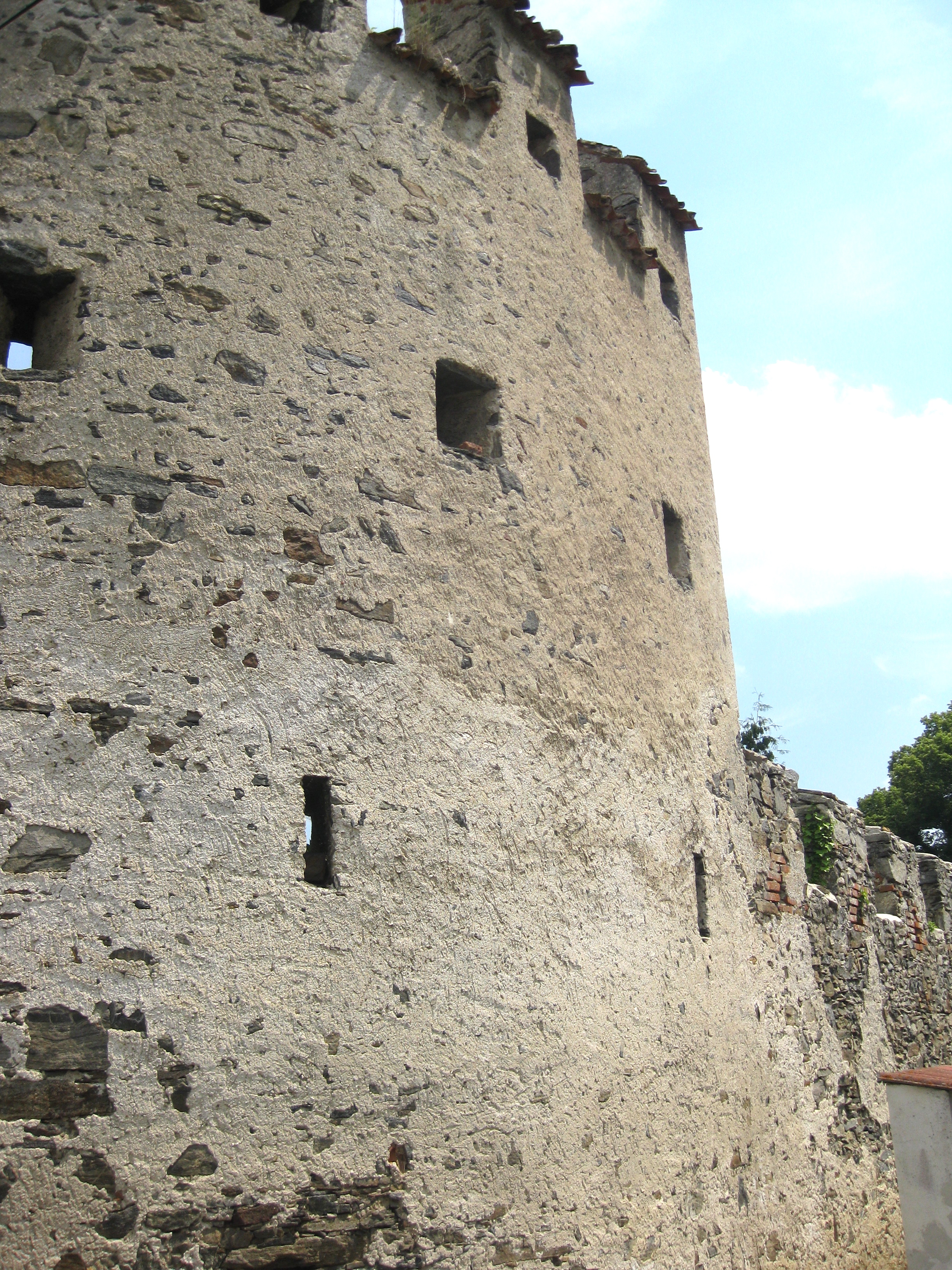
Raabs an der Thaya. Open backed Roundel Tower.

At Melk, a roundel was placed at the southeast corner of the monastery, where it meets the town wall, while at Kufstein a roundel is placed adjacent to the castle -which occupies a citadel position-, so that its cannons would fire over the walls. The need to store gunpowder safely led to the building of special towers such as the Pulverturm at Krems, and at Bludenz and elsewhere.

The need to protect towns from the Swedish onslaught into Habsburg territories during the Thirty Years' War, particularly under Tortennson at the end of the Thirty Years, must have led to the strengthening of the defences of walled towns, particularly in Lower Austria. This can be seen at Waidhofen an der Ybbs, Linz, Melk, and Weiner Neustadt.

From the 1520s onwards, the Habsburg Emperors Ferdinand I and Maximilian II started to employ Italian Military Architects for the refortification of towns and creation of fortresses in the face of the Turkish treat. In 1520 Martino Allio, was appointed Maurermeister in Radkersburg and he was followed about 1530 by his son Domenico dell'Allio(1505–1563). Thickened walls with bastions, ravelins and merlons make their appearance. Vienna, Klagenfurt and Radkersburg now presented an almost impregnable appearance. The D'Allios are seen as the founders of the ‘Grazer School of Architecture’. This group of architects who specialised in military work were of Italian origin but worked mainly from Graz. Their main task was the renewal and strengthening of fortifications along the Hungarian border, parts of which are now in modern Croatia. In the Styrian region at this time, following forts were built, or newly renovated: Graz and the fortress on the Schlossberg (1545–1589, 1597–1639), Marburg / Maribor (1545–1562), Radkersburg (1546–1607), Pettau / Ptuj (1549–1570), Rann / Brežice (1554–1600), Fürstenfeld (1547–1600) and Feldbach (1621–1626). With the growing Turkish threat, which culminated in the siege of Vienna in 1683, the Habsburgs took over the construction of the defences of strategic towns from the local citizens, often using the leading Italian military engineers. Other military architects, some of Italian and some of Swiss /German origin such as Boniface Wolmuet were employed, particularly on the very extensive works at Vienna.

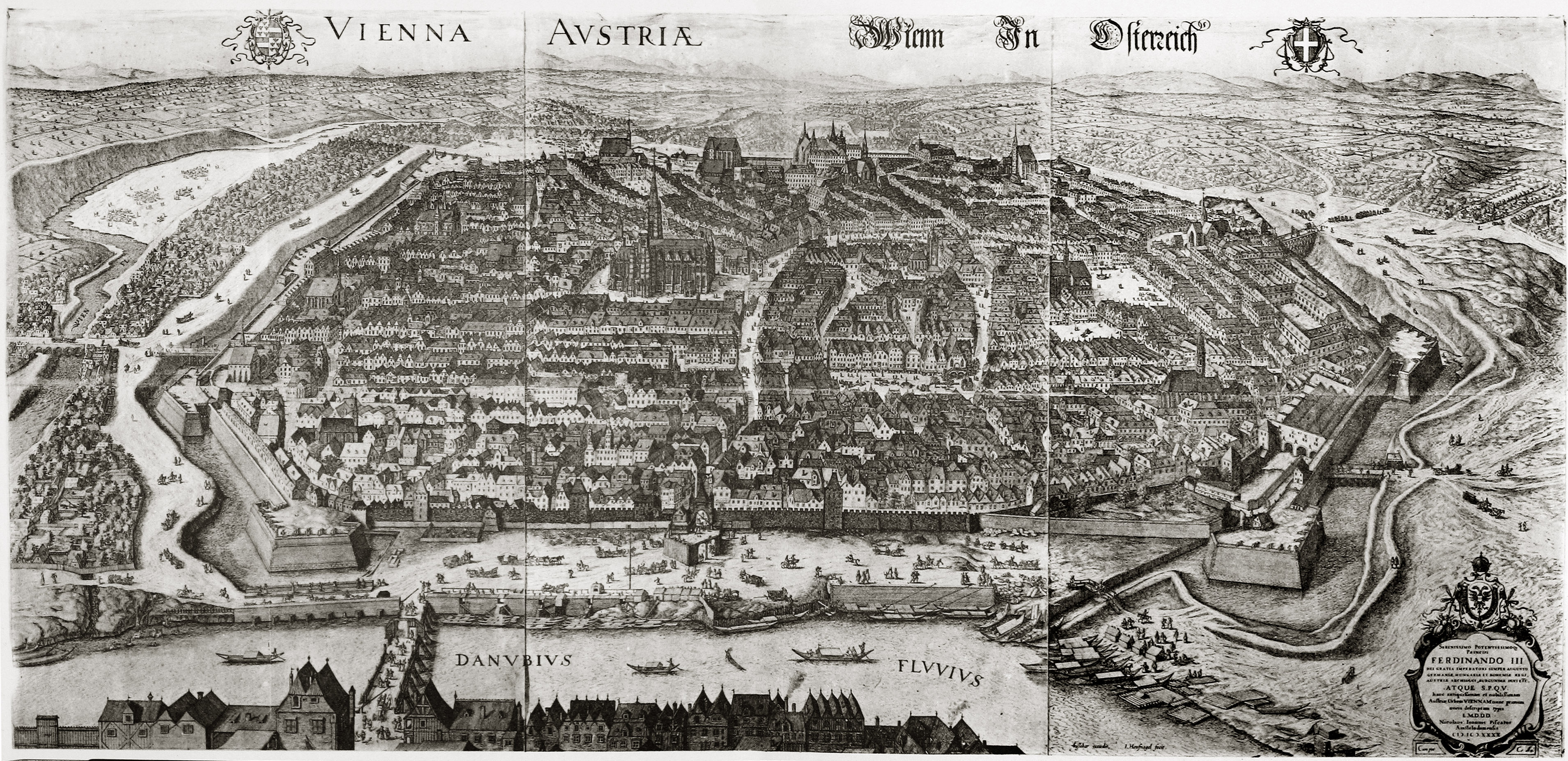
Vienna refortified.

It is noticeable that the Italian style of military architecture did not extend to Upper Austria and apart from Vienna was only employed in a very limited way in Lower Austria. Merian shows that ravelins were added to the corners of the defences of Krems, and the Merian ground plan of Korneuburg shows angle bastions added to the medieval defences. A massive trace bastion was added to the northwest corner of the Obere Stadt at Klosterneuburg, probably as part of a more extensive scheme. This scheme presumably was not required after the withdrawal of the Turks following the siege of Klosterneuburg in 1683 (which took place at the same time as the siege of Vienna). The Prince-Archbishops of Salzburg were slow to adopt the new Italian fashion. At Radstadt their response to the Turkish threat was to use more conventional strengthening of the fortifications, but at Salzburg between 1620 and 1646, the Archbishop Paris von Lodron, under the threat of the Thirty Years' War and the Swedes under Tortennson, commissioned Santino Solari, a Swiss/Italian from Ticino, to expand the defences of Salzburg. In particular four massive trace bastions with ravelins were built around the Mirabell Palace. In 1646 Solari started work at Neumarkt am Wallersee for the Archbishop, but his scheme was probably not completed.

== Maintenance and decline of town defences ==
The granting of a charter (Stadtrecht) would place responsibility on the inhabitants to maintain the walls and defences and also provide a force of citizens (Bürgergarde) to defend the town when necessary, The uniformed Bürgergarde survived in some Austrian towns until they were forced to disband in 1920, but they have been re-established in Radstadt, Murau and Eggenburg. The Bürgergarde were often granted a larger tower on the wall for their musters and other towers may have been granted to craftsmens’ gilds. By the end of the 17th century, evidence from prints suggest that some town walls were starting to fall into decay and in the 18th Century Maria Theresa and Joseph II encouraged the removal of gates to encourage economic growth. But it was the French forces of Napoleon who may have done most to demolish and flatten major fortresses as at Klagenfurt.

Houses were now being built against the walls and in the ditches or moats of many towns and new ring roads started to appear. In Vienna, Mayor Karl Luger undertook the massive demolition task of removing the highly fortified bastions and replacing them with the Ringstrasse. Demolition of walls and towers continued into the 20th century, but now there was growing feeling that they should be preserved for their historic interest. Possibly the first instance of the deliberate conservation of a town wall was in 1909 when the Imperial Ministry of Culture and Education granted Drosendorf 3,000 crowns to undertake a repair programme. At Radkersburg, a start was made on the preservation and display of the elaborate fortifications as early as the 1920s. Hitler, whose birthplace was Braunau am Inn, was aware of the demolition of the north gate-tower of the town in 1893 and had plans prepared (unexecuted) to rebuild it. More recently there has been widespread conservation work undertaken on the town defences of towns such as Weitra, Zwettl, Hainburg, Drosendorf, and Radstadt.

== Topographical prints ==
Early pictures of Austrian walled towns often occur in the most unexpected places. From the 15th century recognisable depictions of walled towns occur as the background to the biblical pictures of the altars of Austrian churches and monasteries. Most notable are views of Vienna and Krems c. 1390–1400 incorporated into the Shottenstift altar in the Scottish Monastery in Vienna. The Abbeys of Zwettl and Klosterneuburg have important manuscripts illustrating the families of their founders, the Kuenringer and the Babenbergs. The picture of Leopold III at Klosternueberg shows both the Abbey and the ‘stadt’ of Klosterneuburg around 1480. Churches and Abbeys often had wall paintings of towns. Amongst these is a detailed view of the ‘stadt’ at Scheibbs in Gaming abbey. The noted artist Albrecht Dürer, who was also a military engineer, visited Innsbruck around 1490, and produced a splendid early watercolour of the ‘stadt’s’ defences. Slightly later the Khevenhüller family commissioned a series of watercolours to illustrate the defences the towns of which they were lords. From the 17th century onwards there are many oil paintings of towns and cities which show their defences. Views of Vienna, Salzberg and Klagenfurt, where the defences have been demolished, are particularly useful for giving an idea of their original condition.

=== Early printed maps ===
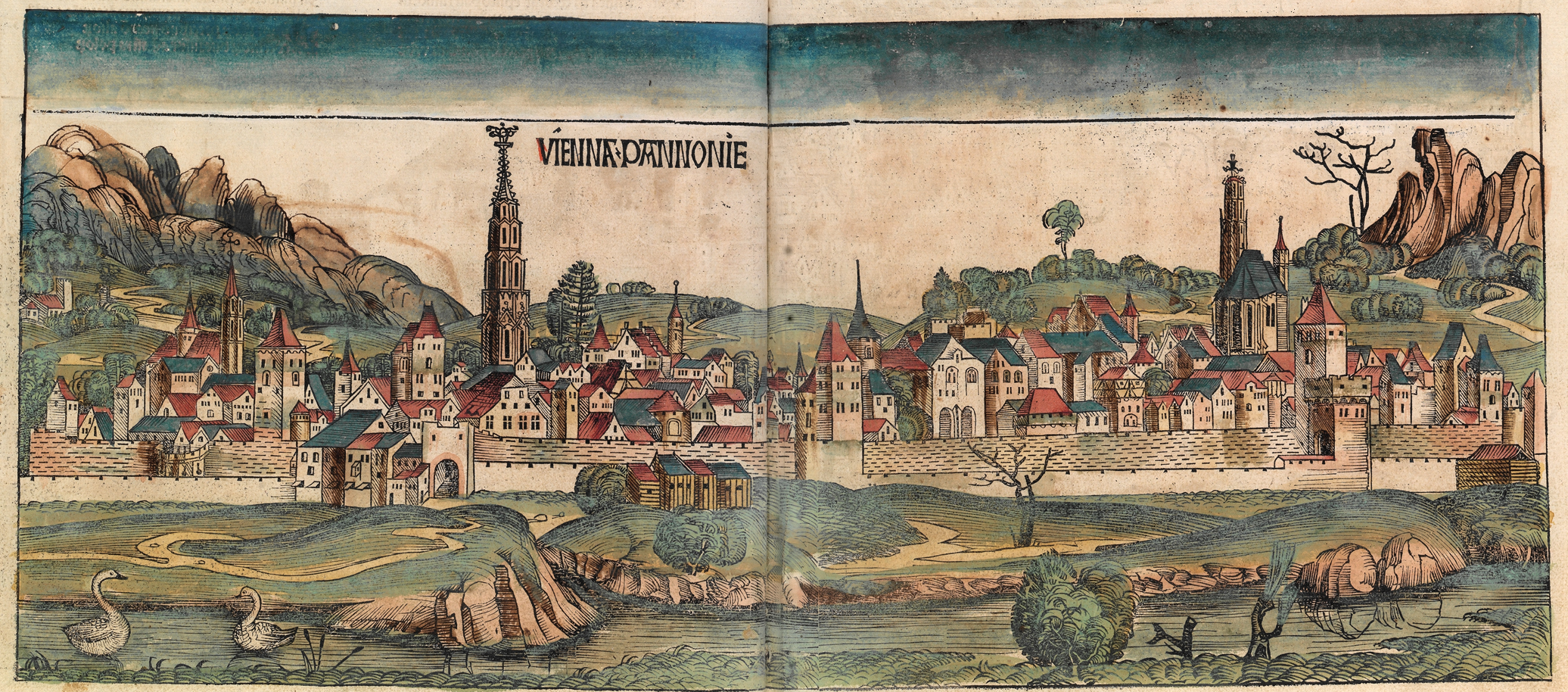
Schedel's view of Vienna in the Nuremberg Chronicles 1493.

The major source for the appearance of walled town in Austria comes from the panoramic prints of towns and cities that were published by various topographical artists. The earliest were by Hartmann Schedel (1440–1514) who published the Nuremberg Chronicle in 1493. This included views of Salzburg and Vienna. He was followed by Sebastian Münster (1488–1552) who included Feldkirch and Vienna in his Cosmographia, published in 1550. Between 1572 and 1617 the six volumes of Civitates Orbis Terrarum by Georg Braun (1541–1622) and Franz Hogenberg (1535–1590) appeared. The five Austrian maps in this were of Salzburg, Vienna, Gmünden, Linz and St Pölten.

=== Engravers ===
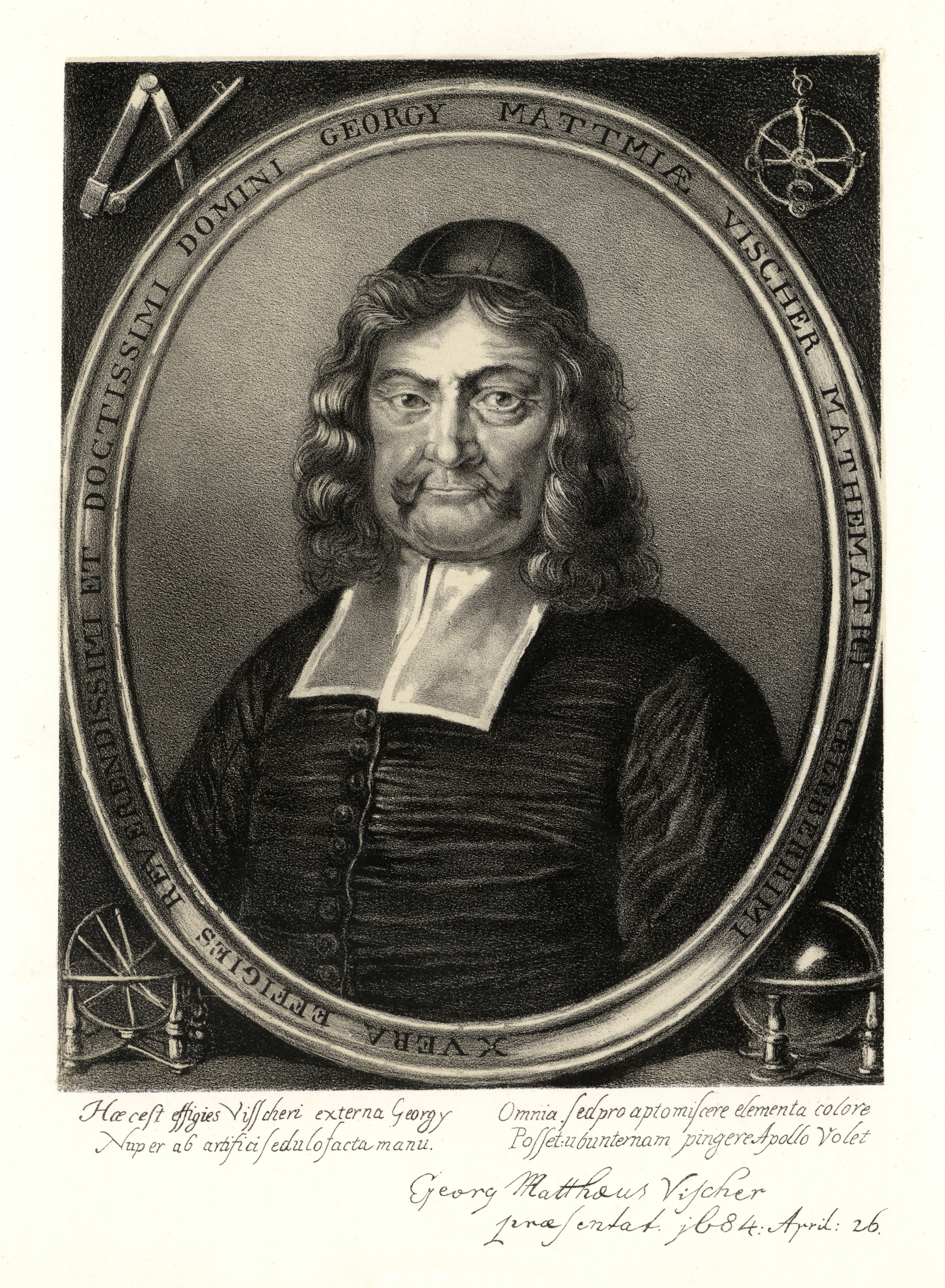
Georg Matthaus Vischer, Austrian Cartographer, mezzotint from 1684.

Between 1642 and 1654 Matthäus Merian, published 16 volumes of engravings and descriptions of towns in Topographia Germaniae. The ninth volume, "Provinciarum Austriacarum", published in Frankfurt am Main in 1649 covered Austria and includes 56 engravings of walled towns. This volume was re-issued in 1679. Merian was followed by Georg Matthäus Vischer who published three works covering the castles, monasteries and fortified towns of Lower Austria in 1672, Upper Austria in 1674 and Styria, which also includes parts of Slovenia in 1681. Often Vischer copied or updated Merian's earlier views, but many of Vischer's works include smaller towns which had not previously been illustrated.

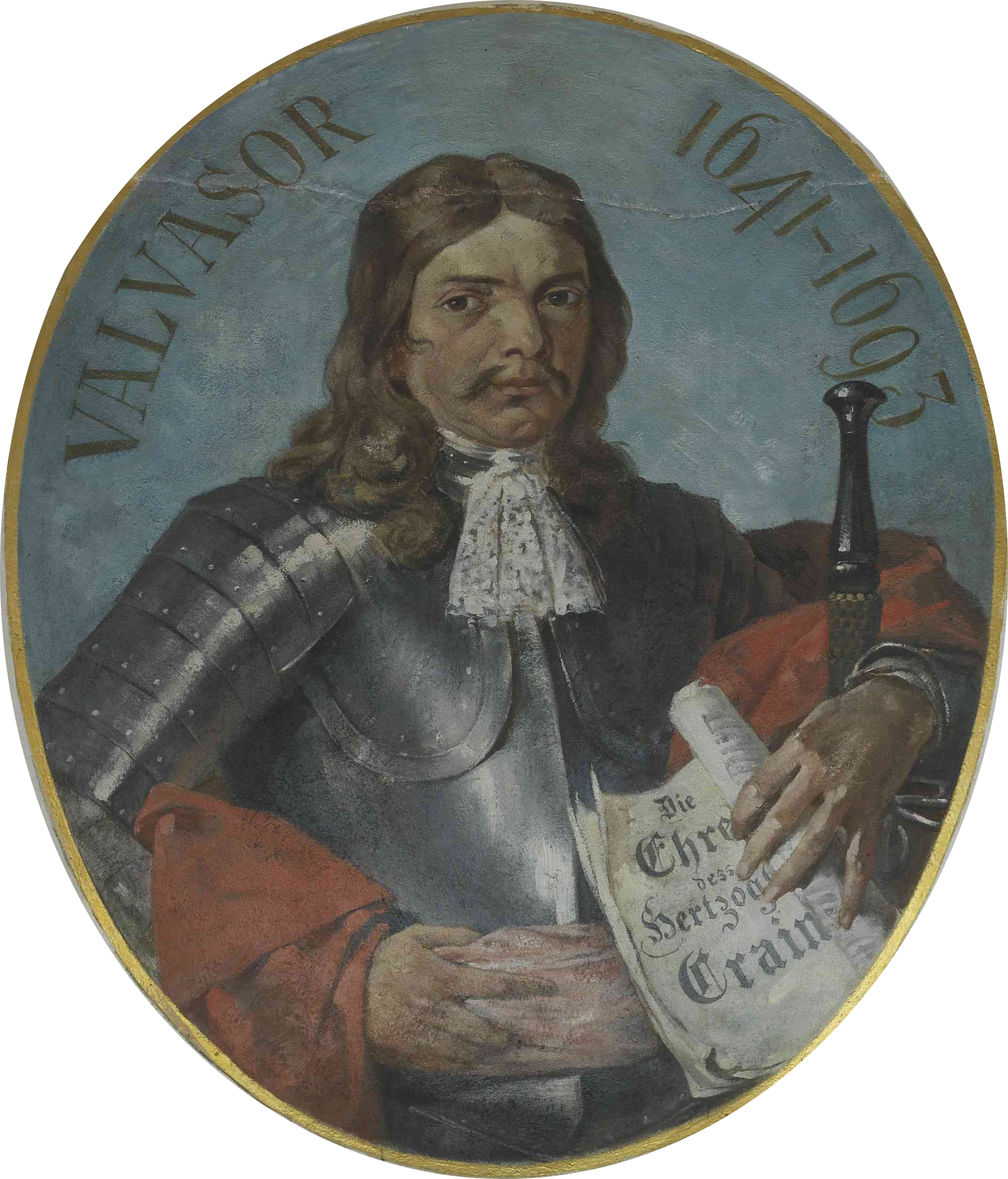
Johann Weikhard von Valvasor, historian and topographical artist.

Johann Weikhard von Valvasor (1641–1693) was the counterpart to Vischer, producing topographical prints of the Duchy of Carniola in 1679, which comprises part of modern Slovenia and Carinthia in 1688. Amongst the Carinthian views are the walled towns of Oberdrauburg, Sachsenburg, St. Veit an der Glan and a view of Klagenfurt showing the Italian style defences constructed by Domenico dell'Allio.

=== Other sources ===
Other important sources are the Josephinische Landesaufnahme and the Franziszeische Landesaufnahme, which were large-scale maps prepared for Empress Maria Theresa and Emperor Frederick in the 18th century. The Josephinische Landesaufnahme was a secret cartographic venture compiled between 1764 and 1787, of which only two handcoloured versions were initially kept, while the Franziszeische Landesaufnahme was a revised version (1807–1869), which was printed. The Josephinische Landesaufnahme which are to the scale of 1:28,800 often show the layout of towns with some evidence for walls, gates and bastions, while the Franziszeische Landesaufnahme often provides information on gates and other features of walled towns.

== Research on town walls ==
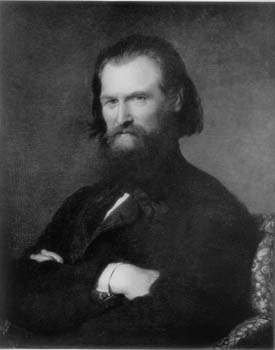
August Ottmar Essenwein.

A pioneering study of Austerian town walls was commenced by August Essenwein (1831–1892), who in the 1870s published a study of the town walls of Friesach in Carinthia. Essenwein was a medieval historian and architect, and was largely responsible for a monumental work on medieval architect and building techniques. His reconstruction drawing of the Frisach fortifications give considerable insight into the appearance of Austrian walled towns.

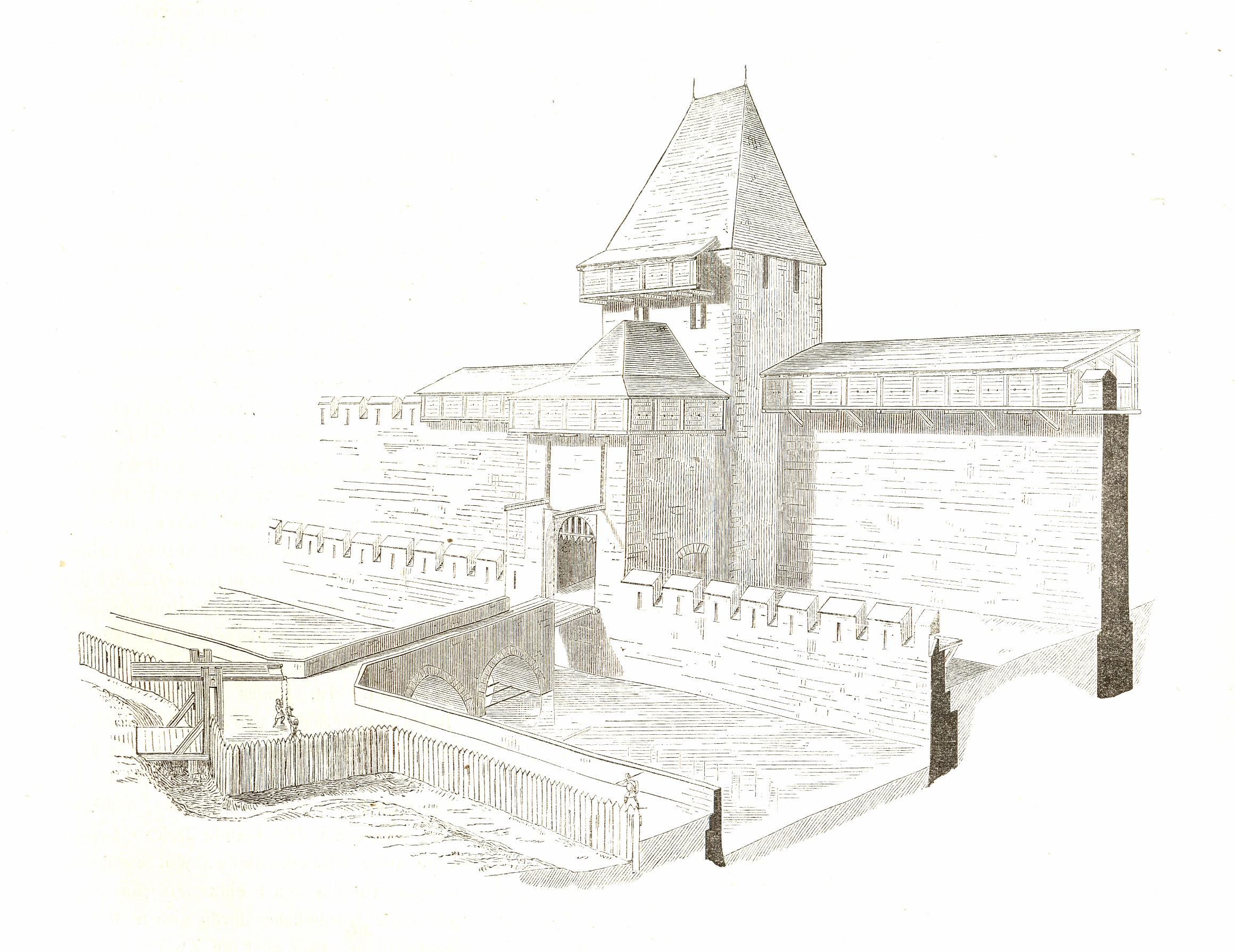
Baudenkmale der Stadt Friesach Neumarkter Thor reconstruction.

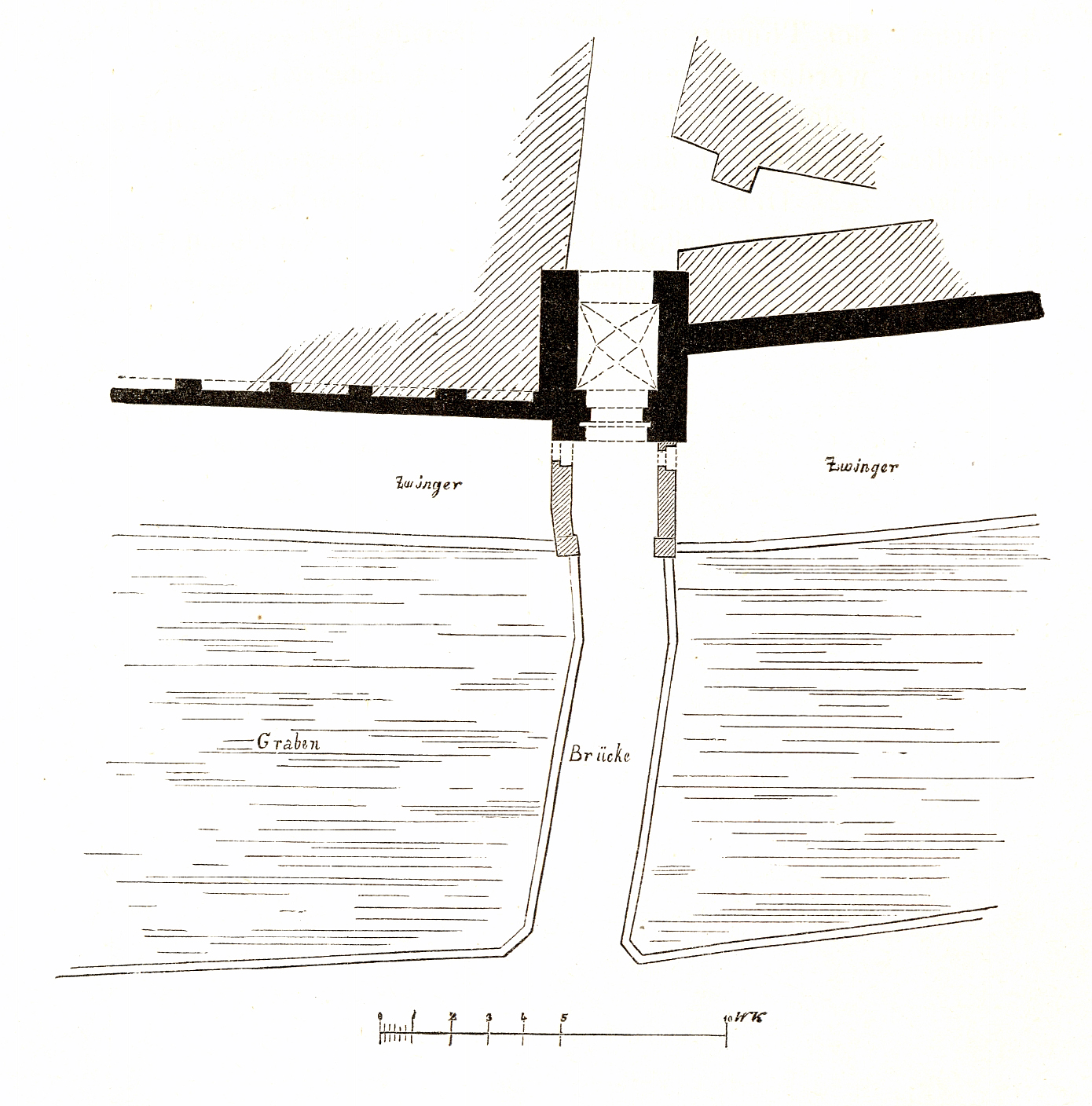
Baudenkmale der Stadt Friesach Neumarkter Thor – Groundplan.

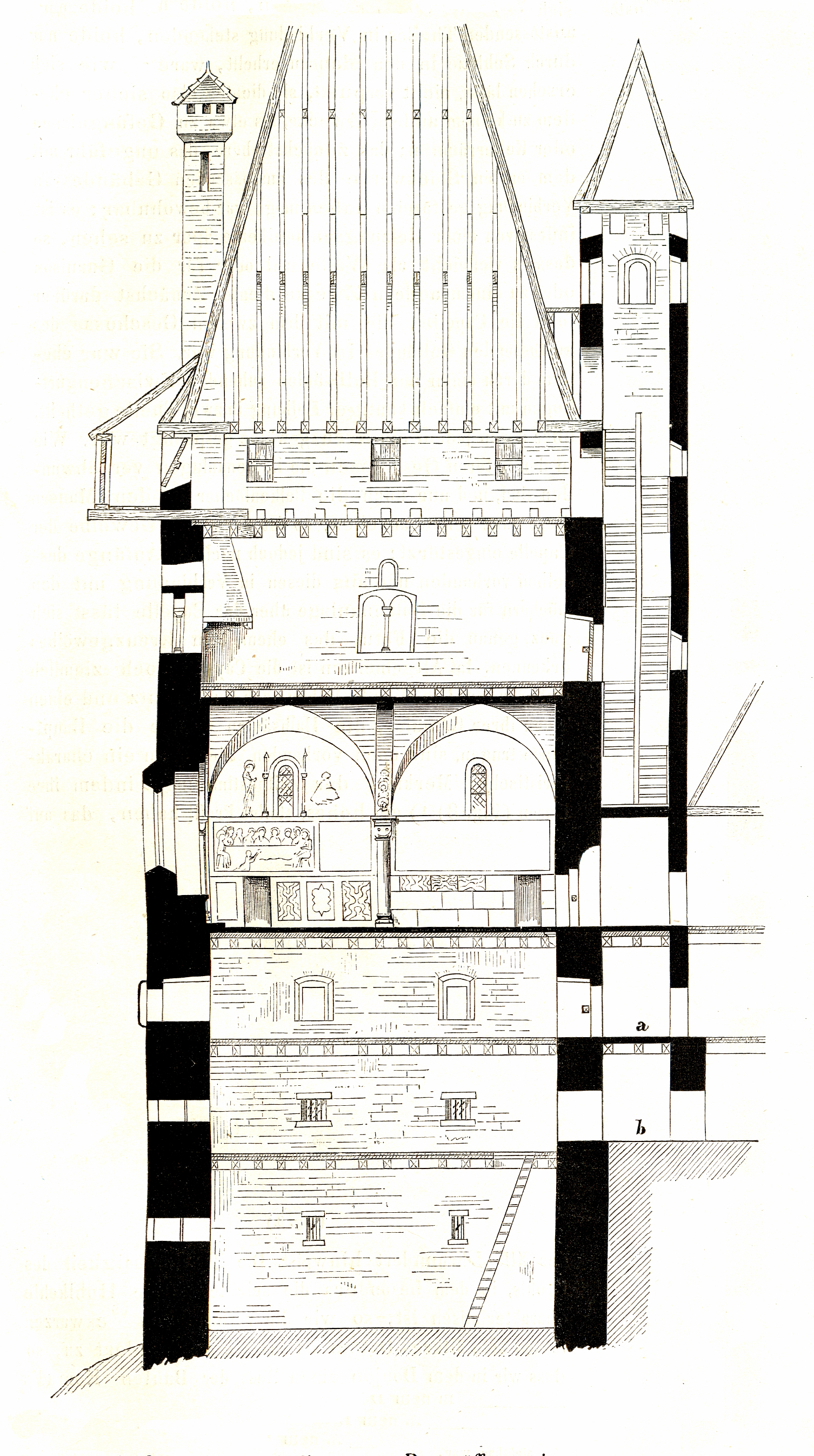
Baudenkmale der Stadt Friesach, Festung Hauptturm reconstruction.

The research being undertaken since 1982 for the Österreichischer Städteatlas which is part the International Commission for the History of Towns is providing additional information about walled towns and their layout. This provides maps for the specific periods and gives details of early prints and maps as well as other source material. So far 54 town atlases have appeared, most of which are for walled towns.

With the availability of GIS imagery through Google Earth and the Austrian Landes websites it is now possible to bring together with documentary prints and historical sources, a far more detailed picture of existing remains and the former appearance of the walled towns. The Landes sites for Upper and Lower Austria Styria and the Tyrol provide more detailed aerial photographs on which present day property boundaries can be overlaid, often revealing remarkable details of town walls, which may be missed on the ground, The Styrian site also reproduces the large scale map of the province in 1778 and the Upper Austrian site the Franz Josef Kataster of the 1830s, which provides many details, particular the existence of gate-towers, which have been subsequently removed. On the Vienna site there is a series of large scale historic maps showing in great detail the fortifications of at various periods, together with a commentary on the work of the Military engineers who were involved in this work.

== Town walls in Austria ==
=== Burgenland ===
- Donnerskirchen. Granted a market charter in 1659, in 1661 a wall was built around the town. Much of the wall has disappeared, but a portion of the wall still survives around the fortified parish church.
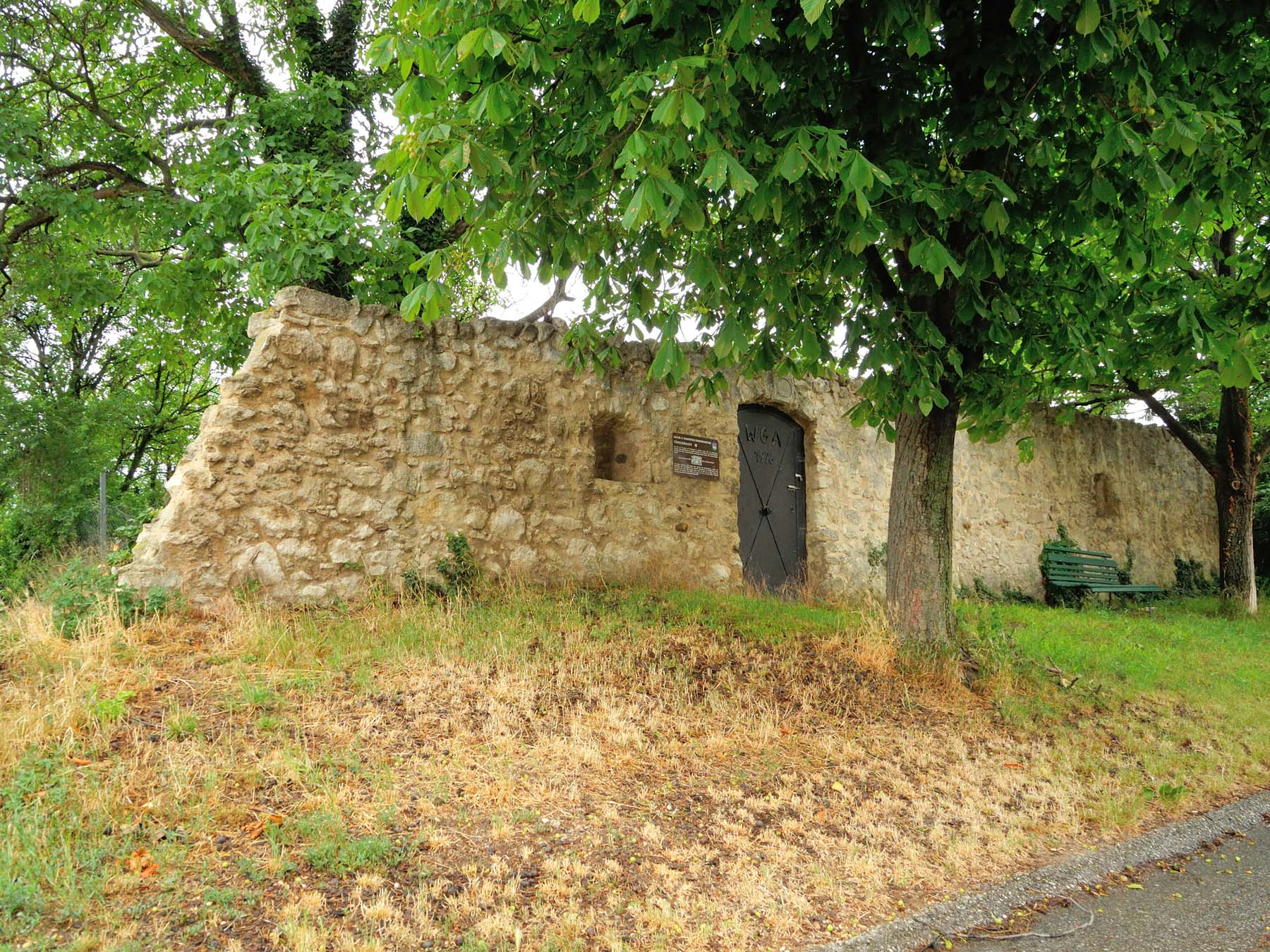
Town wall in Donnerskirchen

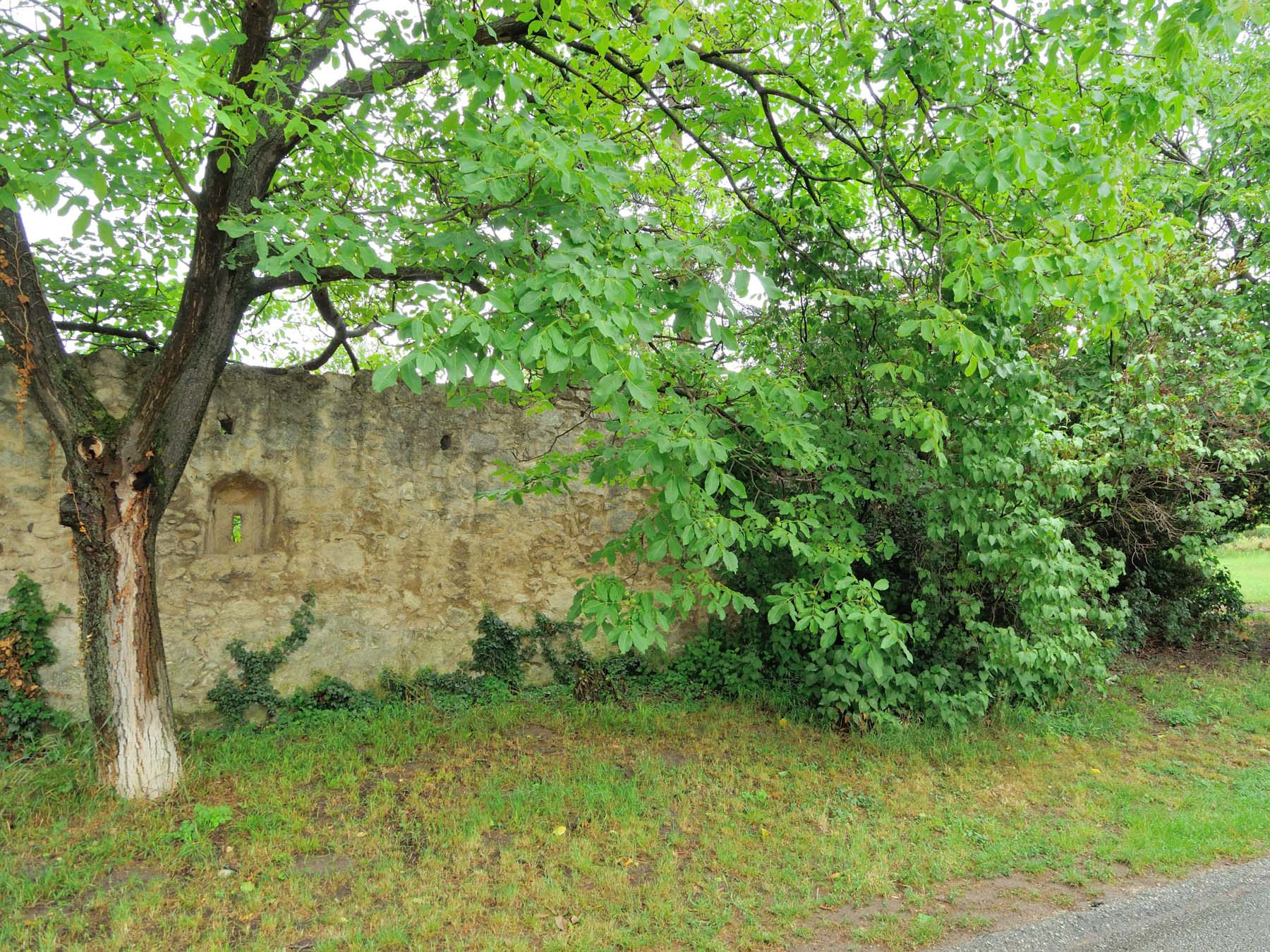
Town wall in Donnerskirchen
- Eisenstadt. Mentioned as "Castrum Ferrum" in 1118. In 1300 there a reference to "Zabemortun" – a Hungarian term for the Free settlement of St Martin, probably implying that it was a market town. In 1372 King Louis of Hungary mentions Eisenstadt as part of the Manor of Hornstein and in 1373 it was granted a manorial town charter and given to the Kanizsay family, who were given permission to enclose the town with a wall. Market rights granted 1388. The town was taken by the Turks in 1529 and again in 1532. The town is shown from the north in the Merian print of 1649/1679. Today the northern wall still largely survives, with an angled bastion at the northeast, and a long stretch of wall on the south with a larger low bastion on the southeast corner.
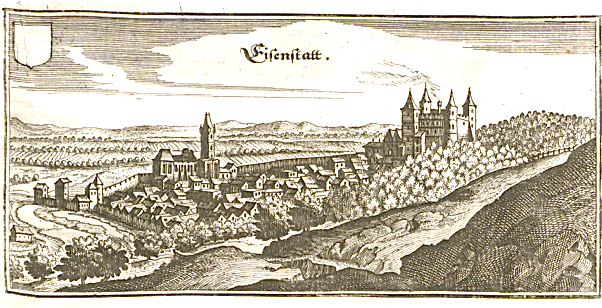
Matthäus Merian Eisenstadt, 1679

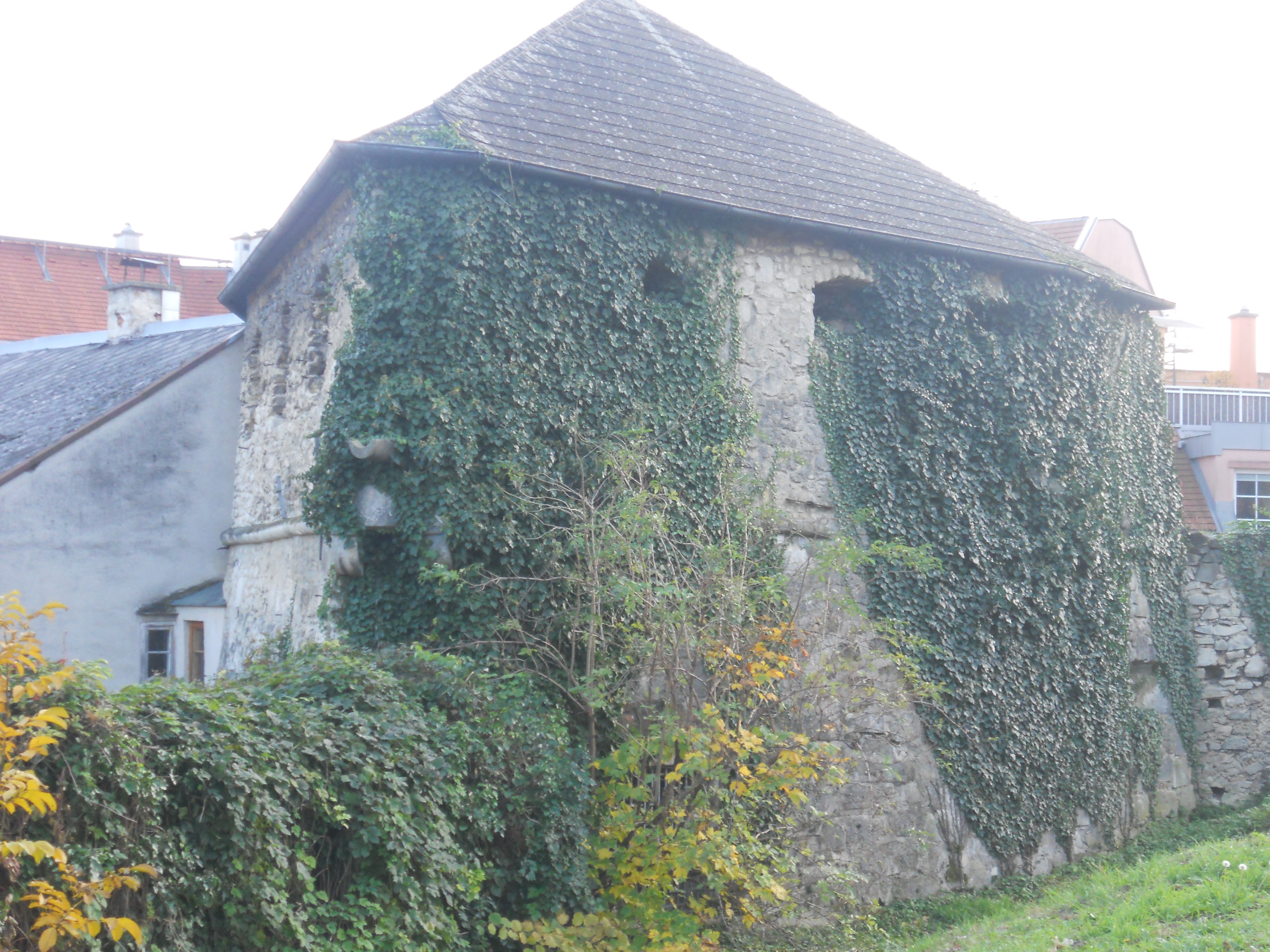
Pulverturm Eisenstadt

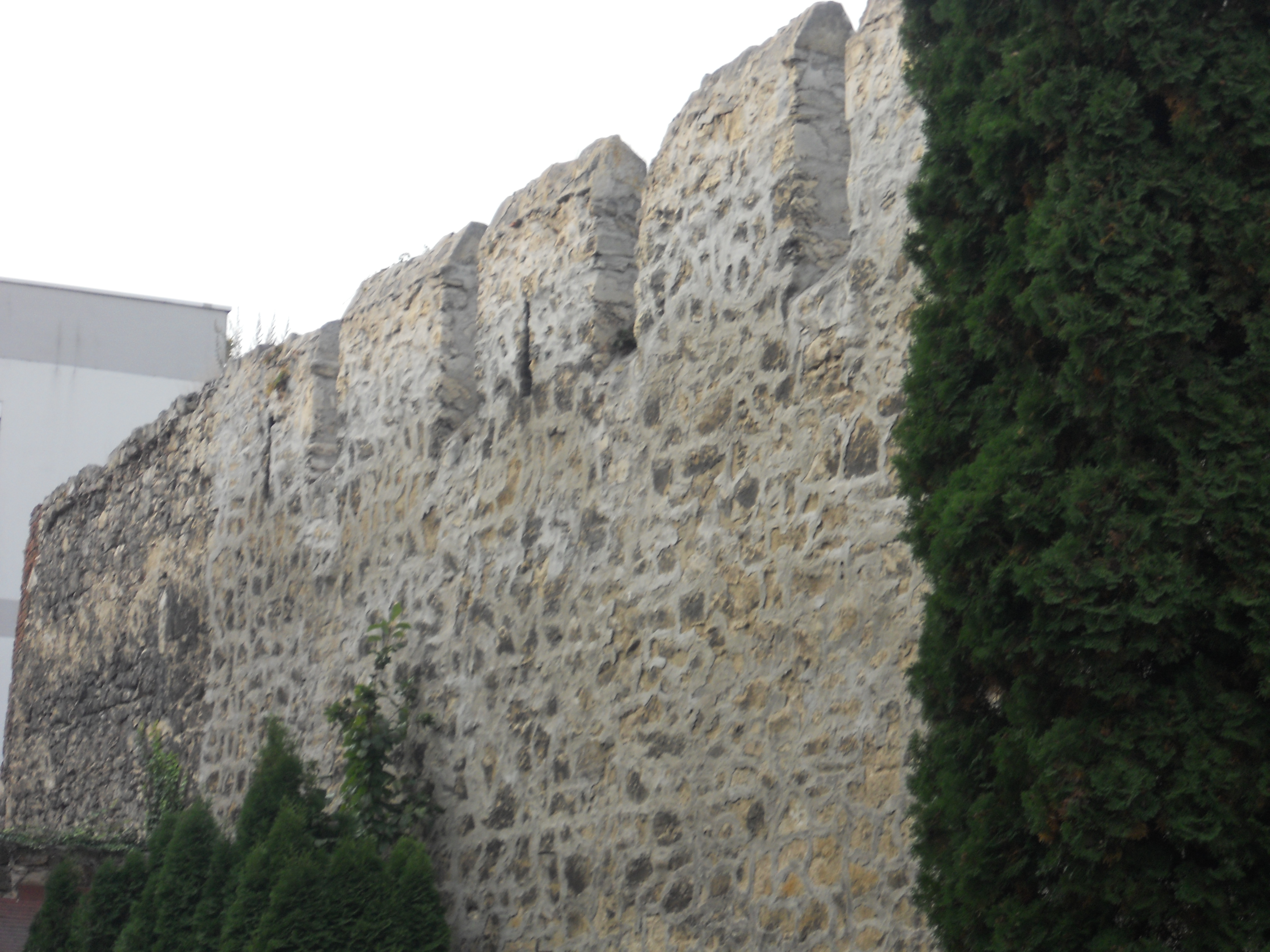
Eisenstadt Town wall
- Gussing. First mentioned in 1157 when the Benedictine Abbey was founded.
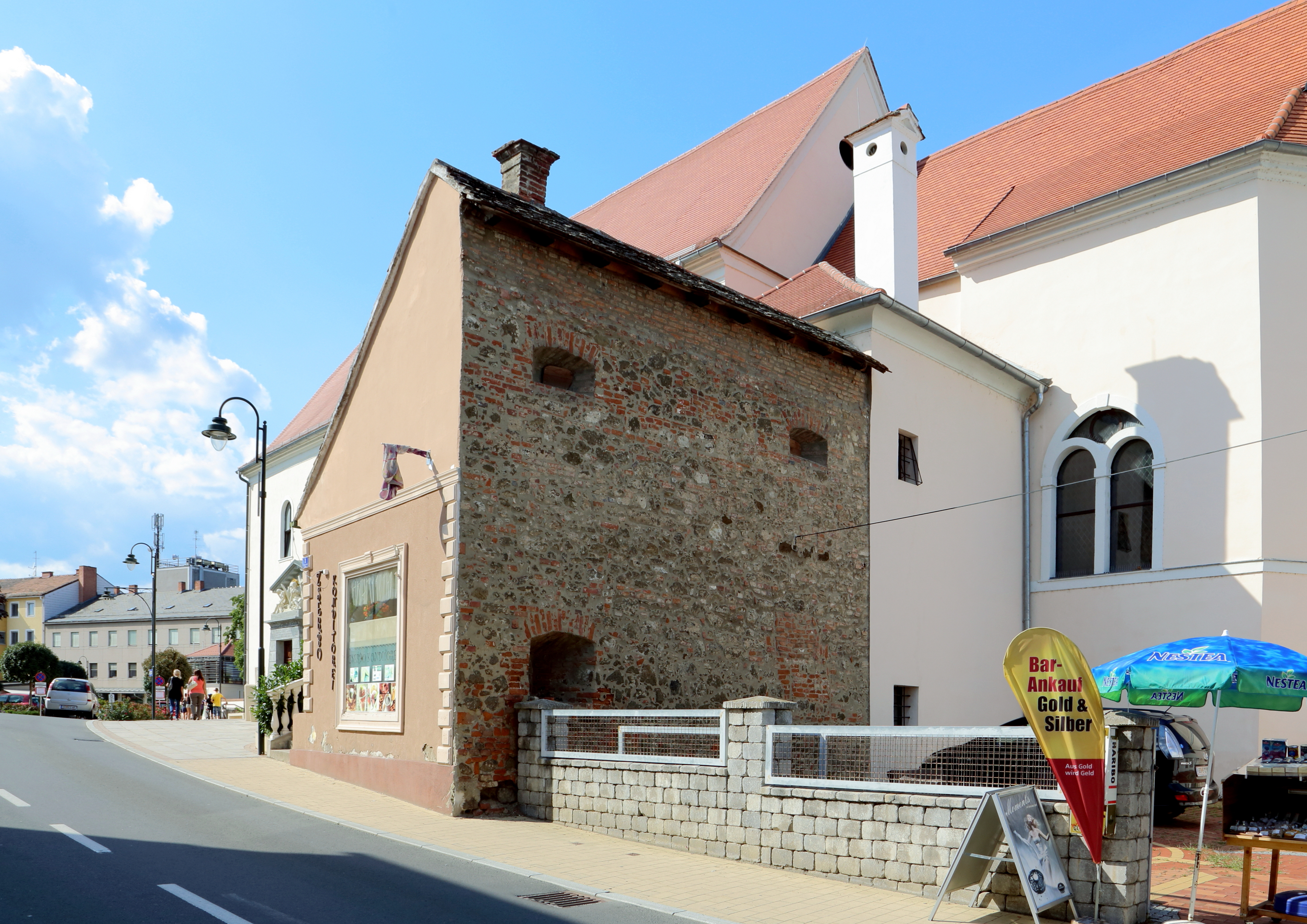
Güssing - Town Wall Leser-Straße

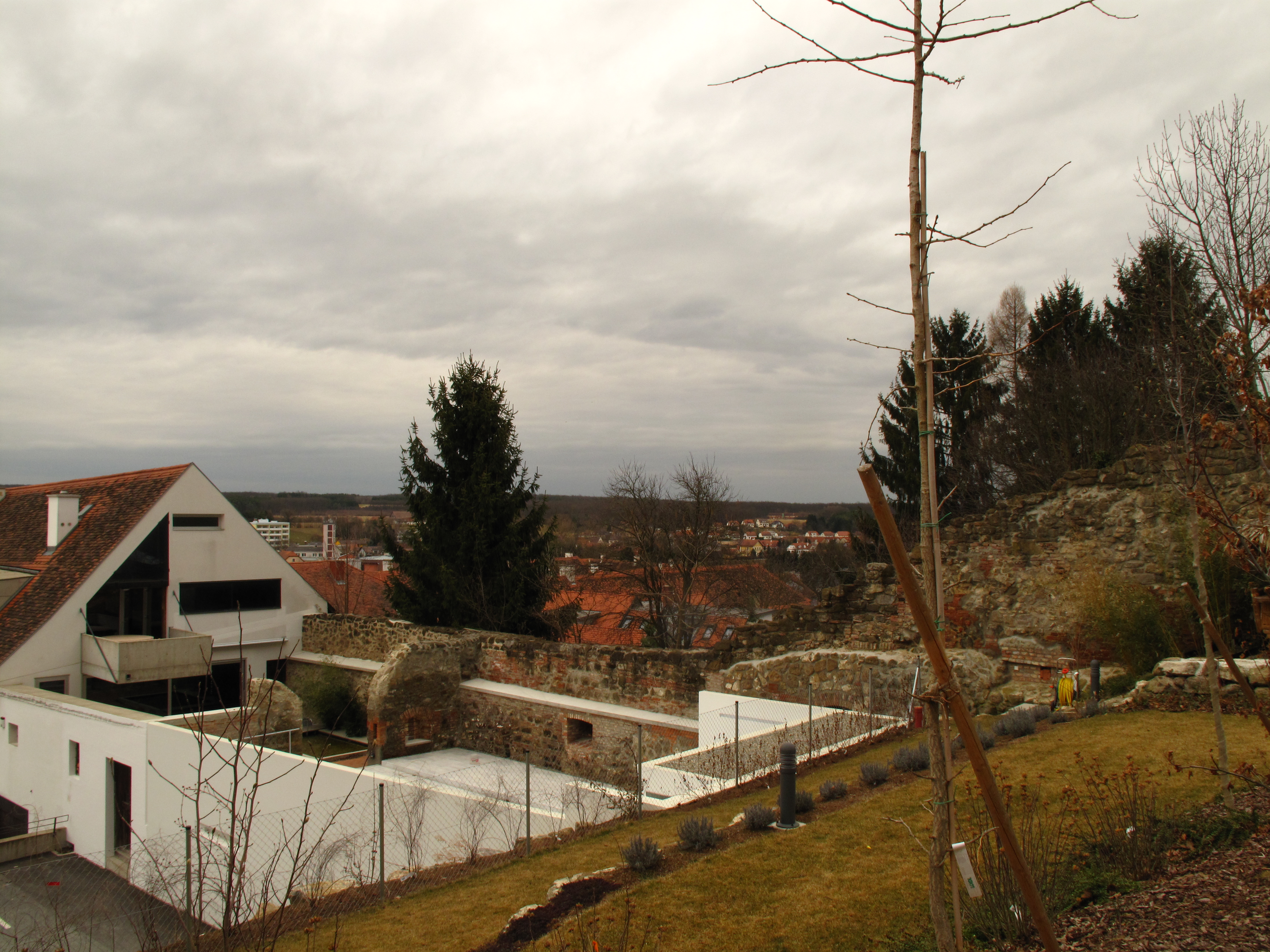
Stadtmauer Güssing (Clusiusweg 1)

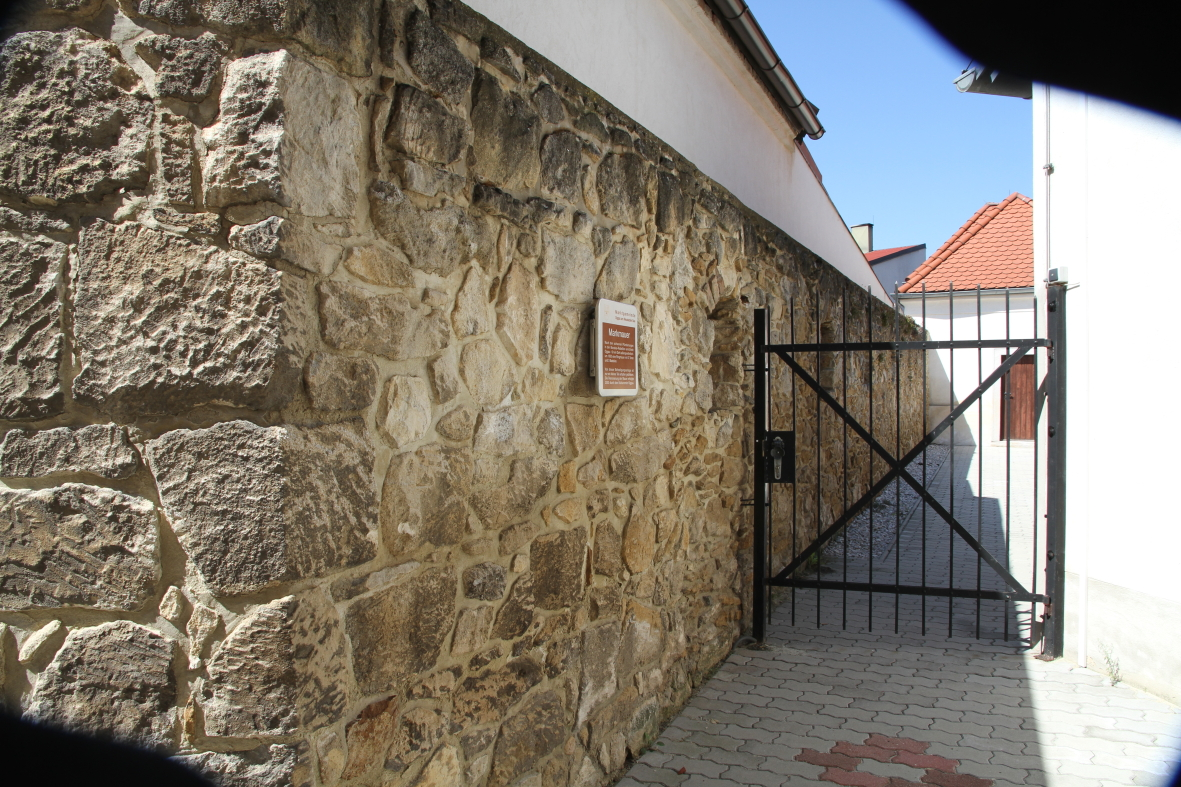
Oggau town wall

- Oggau am Neusiedler See. Defences constructed in the earlier part of the 17th century that consisted of a wall with two gateways and three bastions, Today only two lengths of wall survive including a 55 meter restored length behind the Kindergarten School with 14 keyhole gun ports.
- Purbach am Neusiedler See. Almost rectangular walled defences built in the 1630s with four gate-towers which were completed in 1634. Most of the wall survives, as well as the Nordtor, Westtor and Sudtor gate-towers. There are angle bastions at the corners, similar to those at Eisenstadt, for the mounting of artillery.
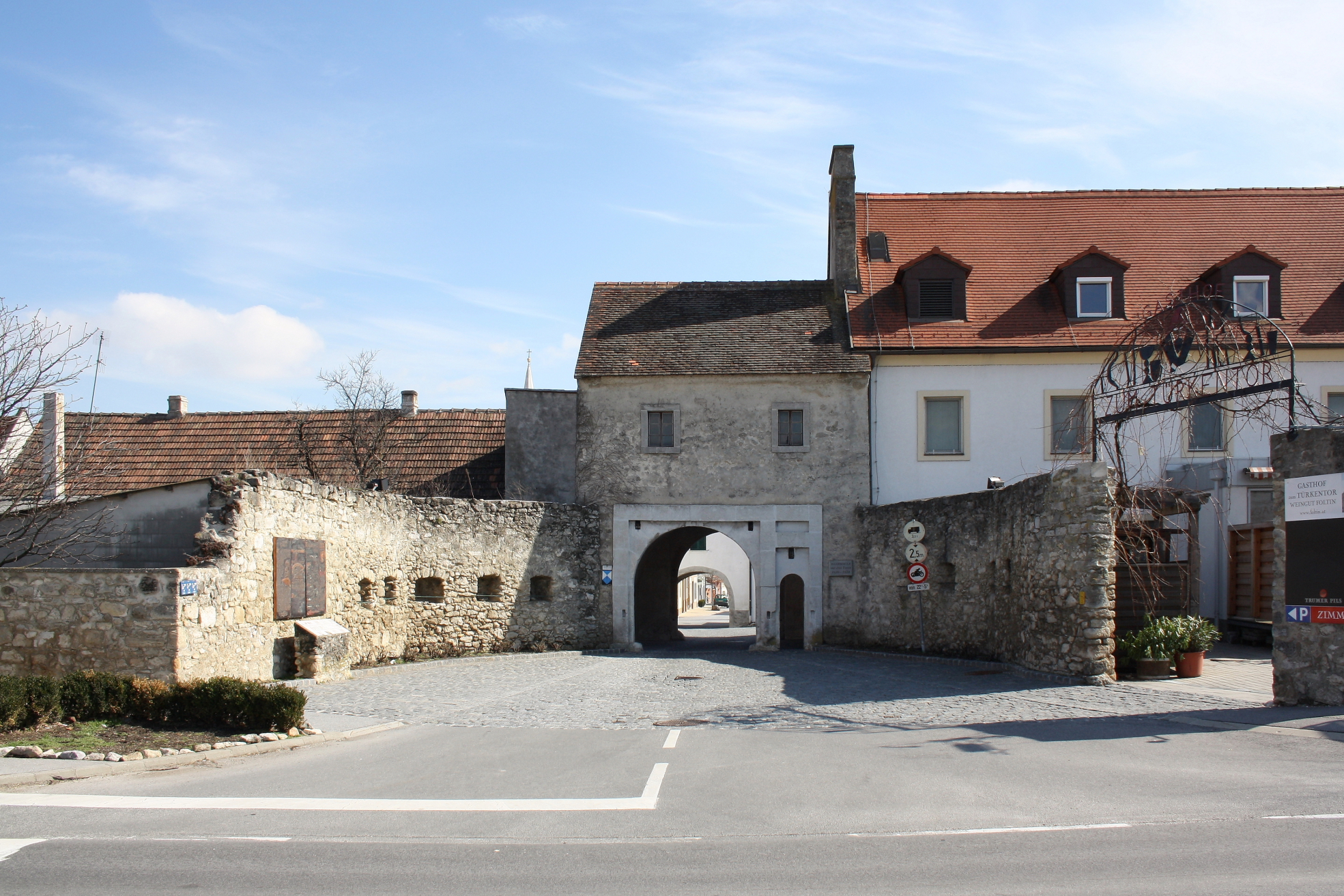
Türkentor in Purbach

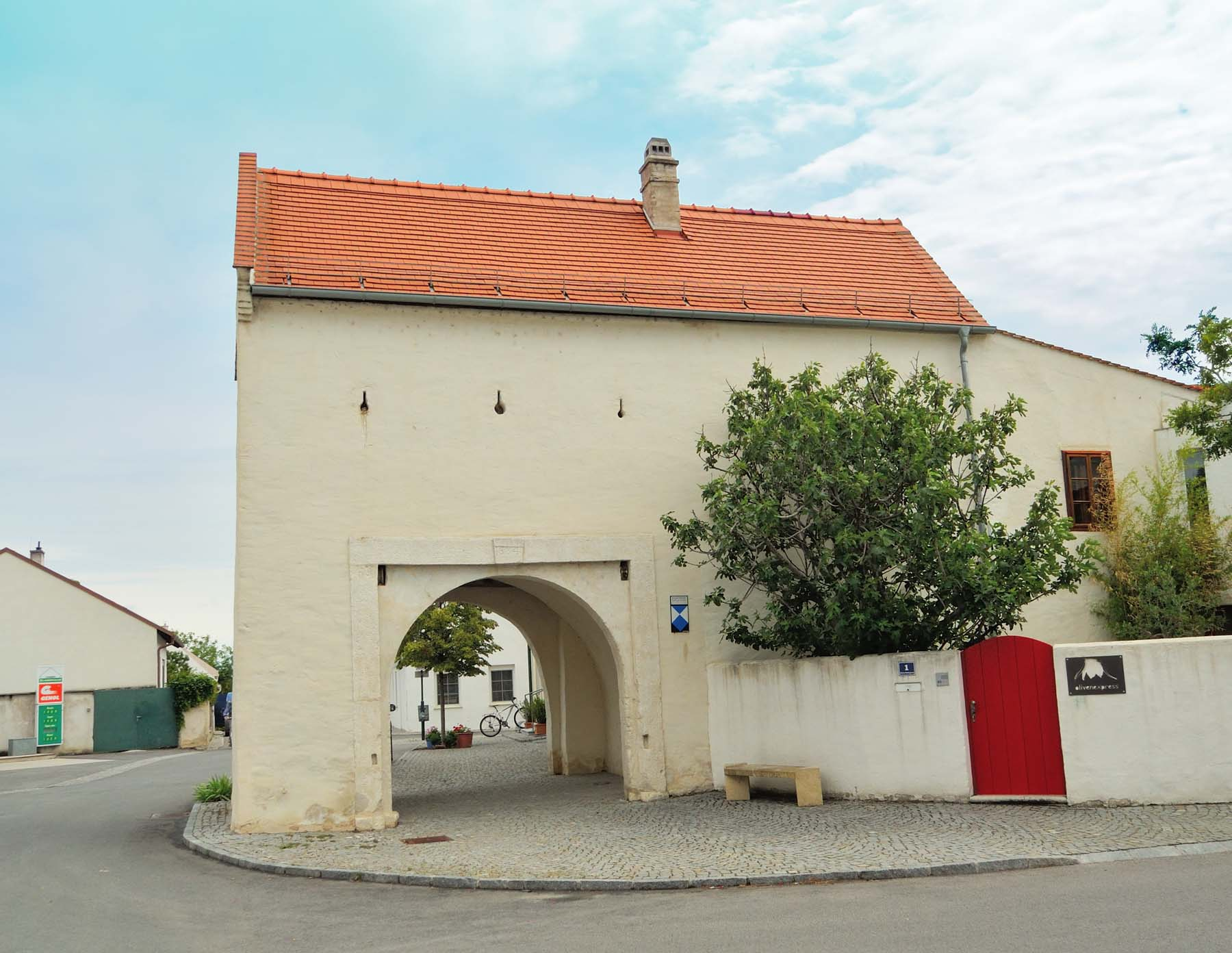
Rustertor in Purbach

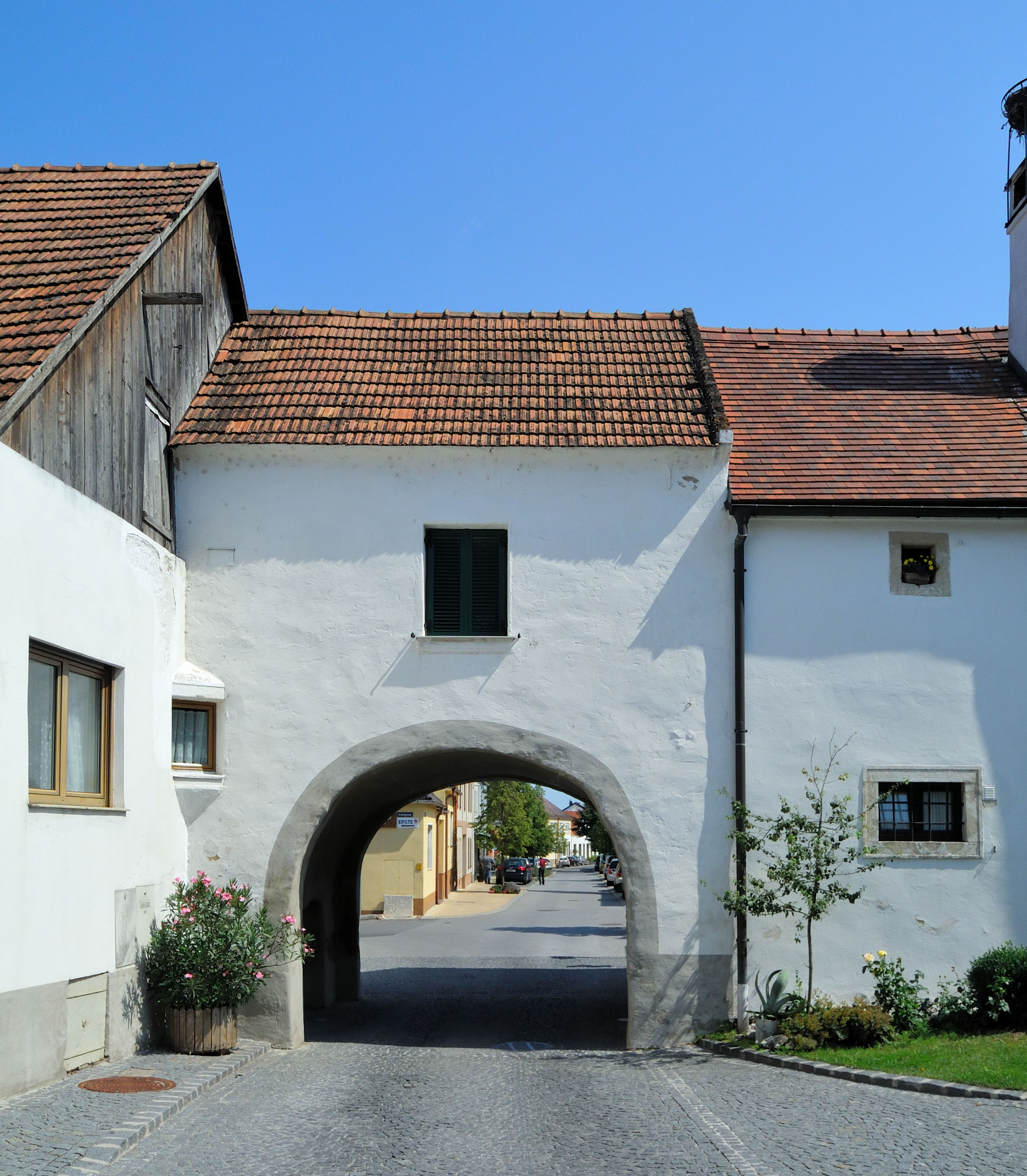
Stadtbefestigung in Purbach

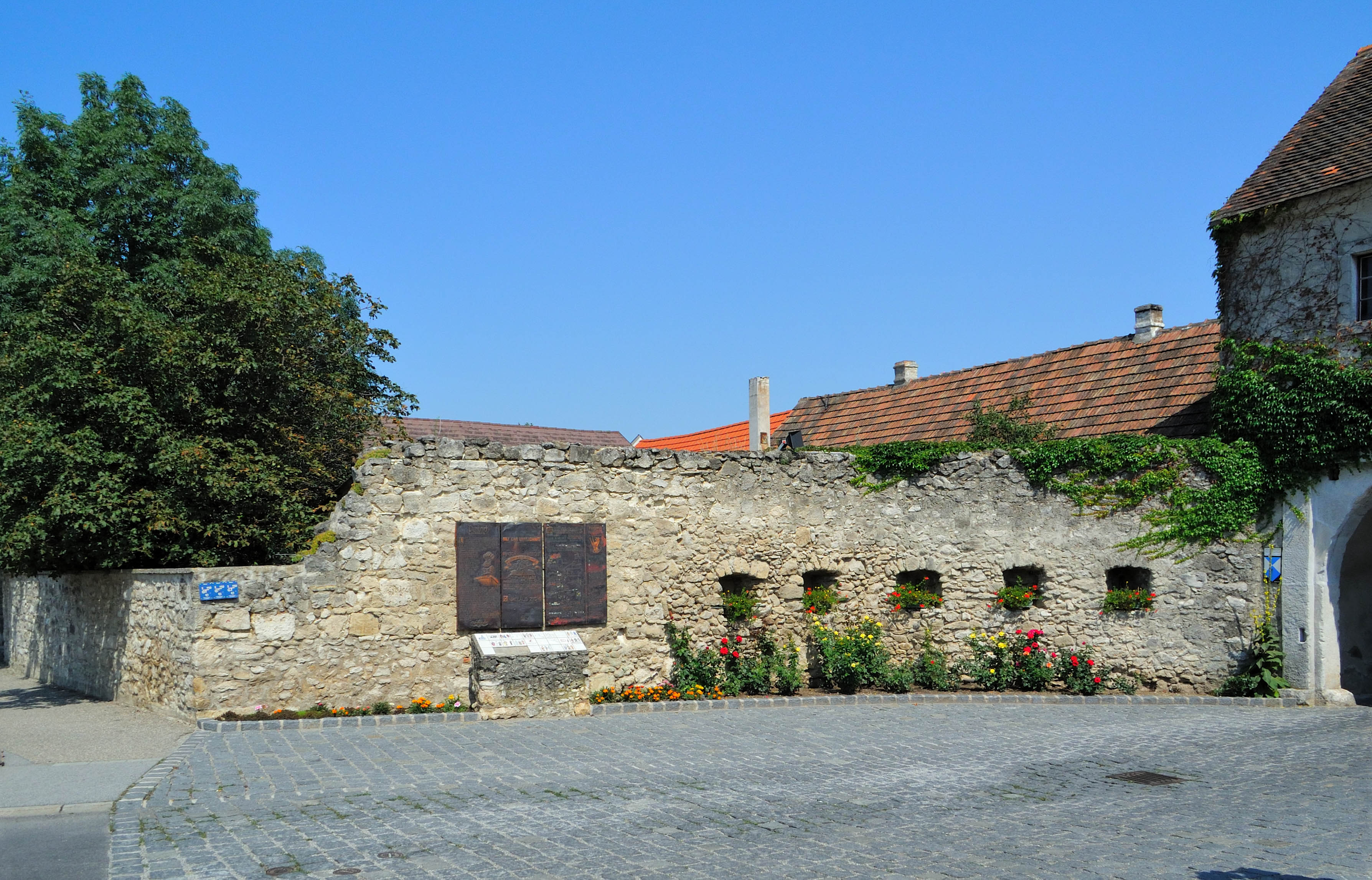
Purbach
- Rust was granted market rights in 1470 and walls were built round the town in 1512 by Count Peter von Bosing. Ravaged by the Turks in 1529. There is a five-sided corner tower at the northeast dated 1614 and angle bastions for artillery were added in 1640. Walls and moat survive in the SW. The Alte Pfarrkirche is surrounded by houses, suggesting that a fortified "Tabor" existed. Originally three town gates, and the Old Town Gate or Lake gate (towards the Neusiedler See) still exist. In 1681 the citizens of Rust purchased a Charter from Emperor Leopold I and Rust becomes a ’Royal Free City’ or Stadt. In 1703 Rust surrendered without a fight in the Kuruzzen wars and Count Karoly, a Kuruzzen General, set up his main headquarters in Rust.
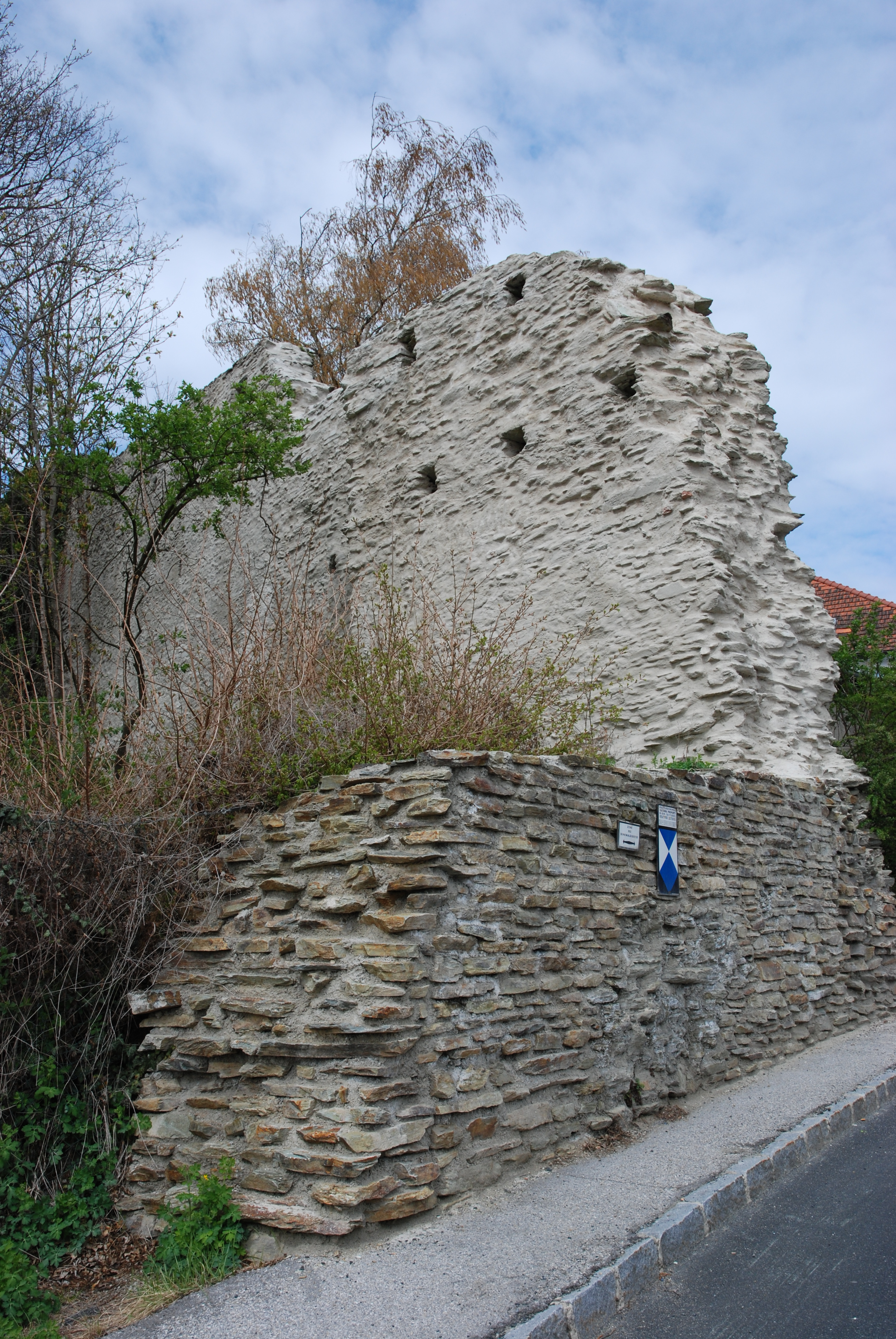
  Teile der stadtmauer klingergasse schlaining
- Stadtschlaining is a planned town, laid out by Andreas Baum Kircher between 1461, (when he was granted Schlaining Castle by Emperor Frederich III) and his execution in 1471 for his part in an uprising against the emperor. The town lies below Schlaining castle and is almost rectangular with surviving walls, but the gate towers have been demolished.

=== Carinthia (Kärnten) ===
- Friesach. The site of this town was given by Ludwig the German to the Archbishop of Salzburg in 860 AD, and the town later housed the Archbishop's mint. The town defences were the subject of a notable early study by A Essenwein in 1863. An impressive town wall, 11 metres high, in three angled lengths, runs from the ruins of the Petersburg Castle in the northwest to the Vergilienberg Castle in the S. This is on the east side of the town and in front of this wall is a secondary wall surrounded with moat filled with water- the three gate towers have been demolished. On the west side, walls still remain linking a further small castle, the Rotturm, to the other two castles.
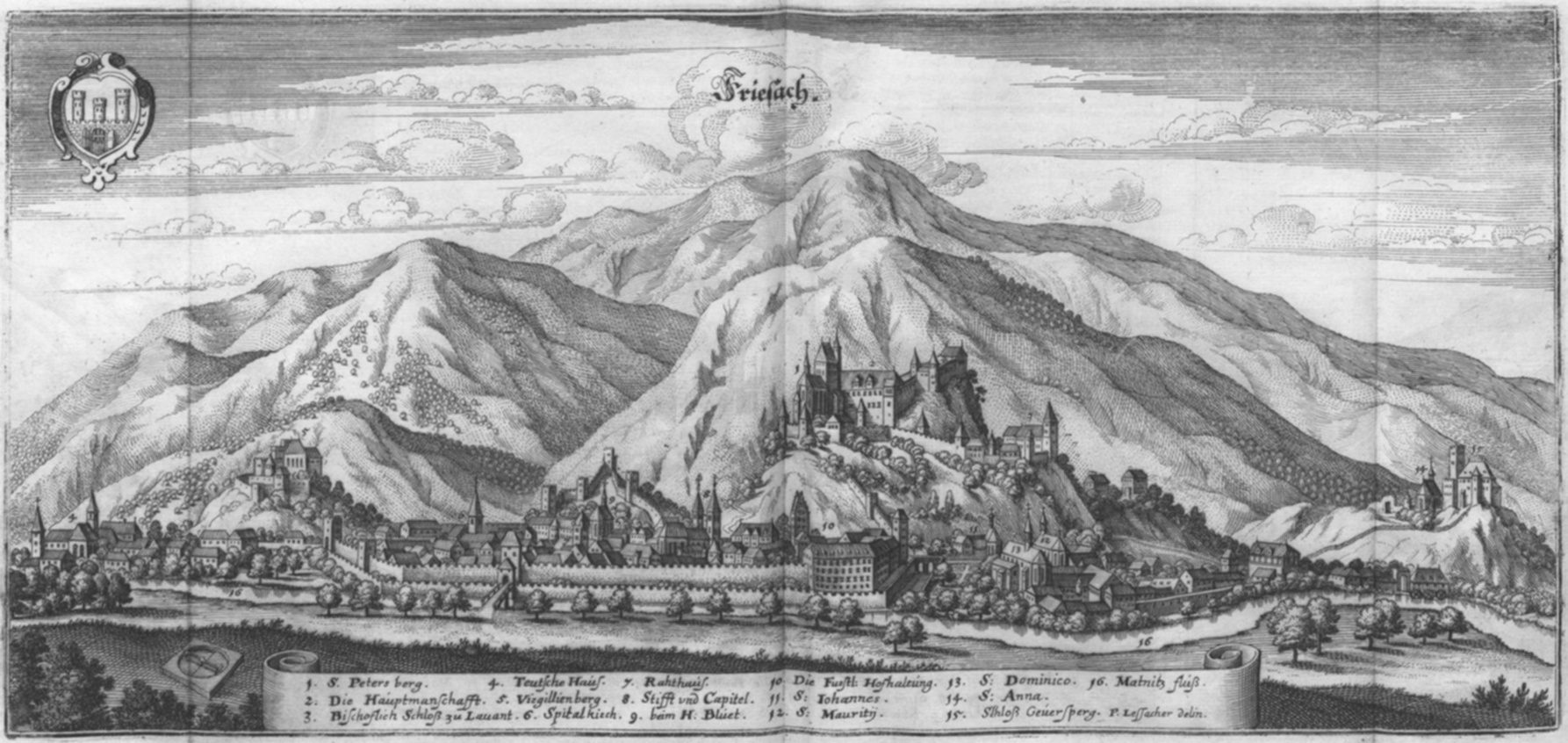
Statt Friesach (Merian)

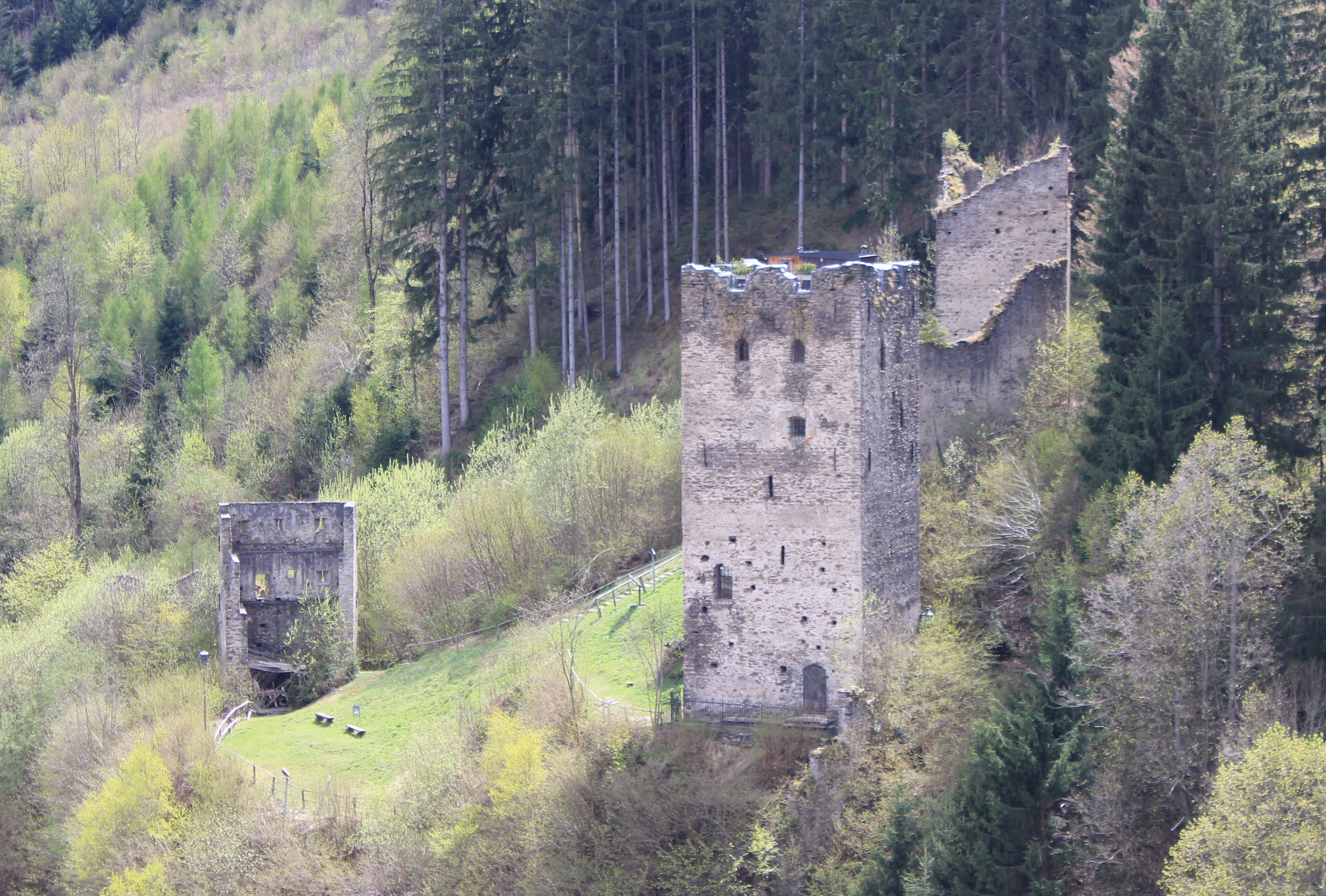
Friesach - Rotturm

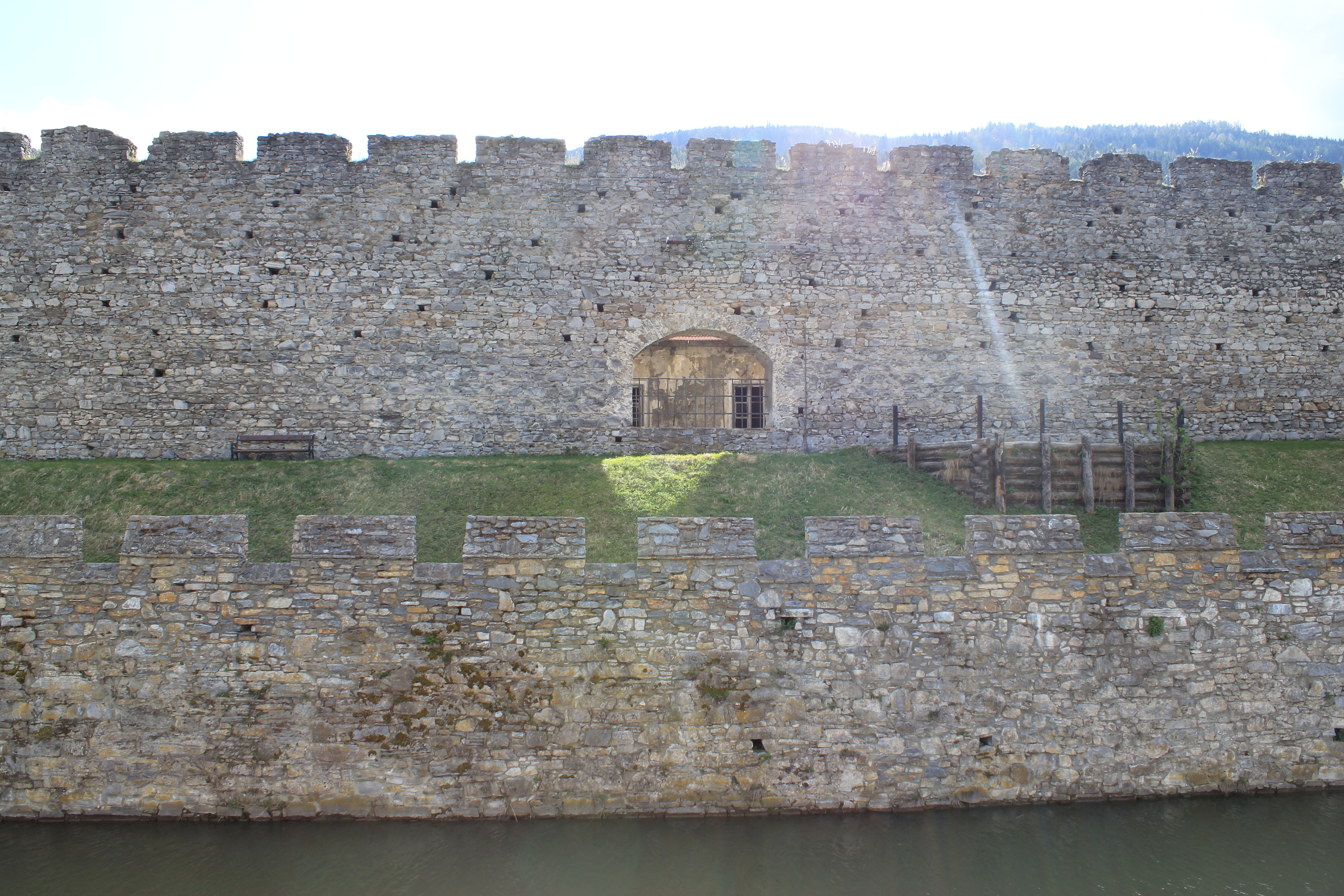
Friesach - Stadtmauer

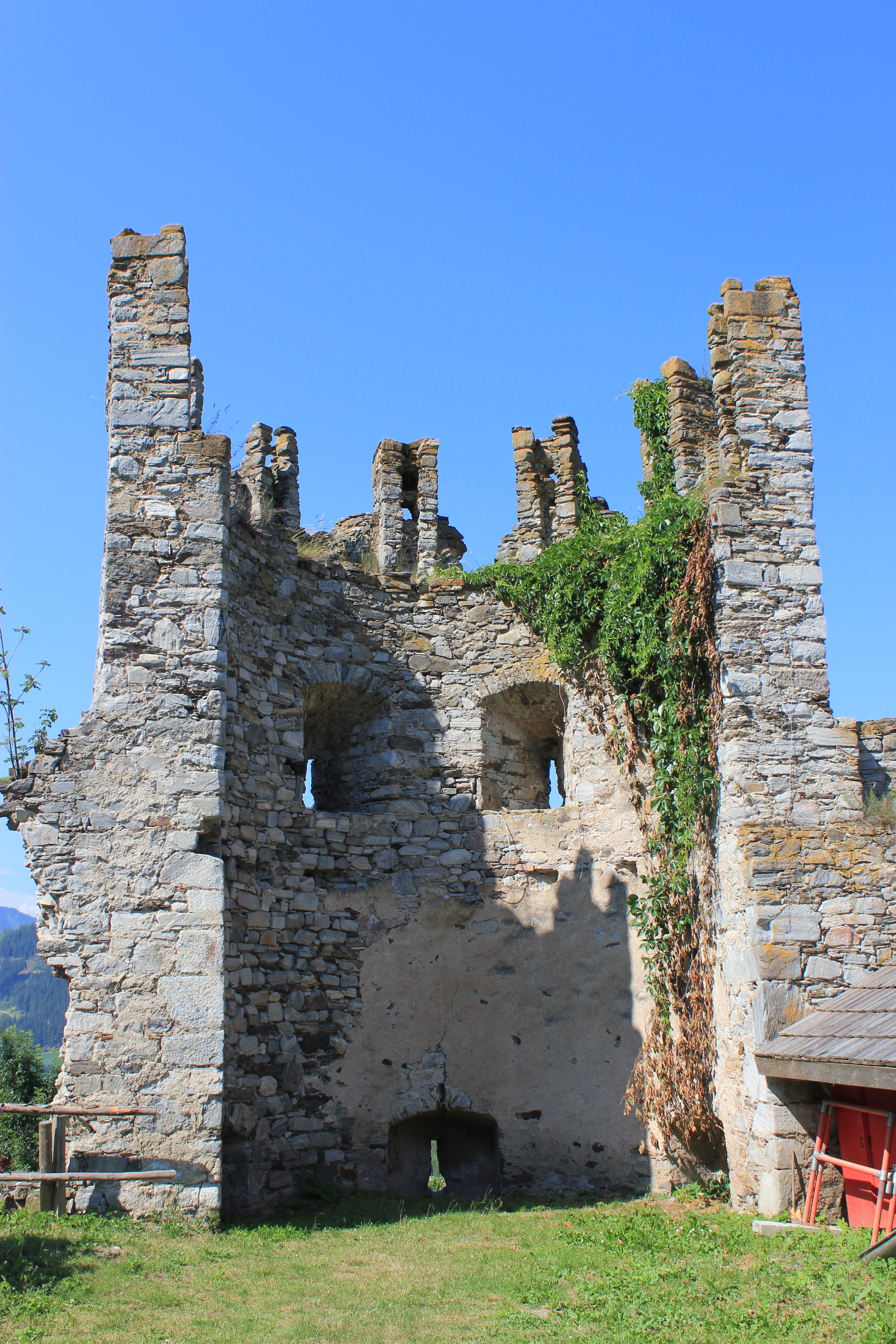
Petersberg-Schalenturm - Open-backed tower

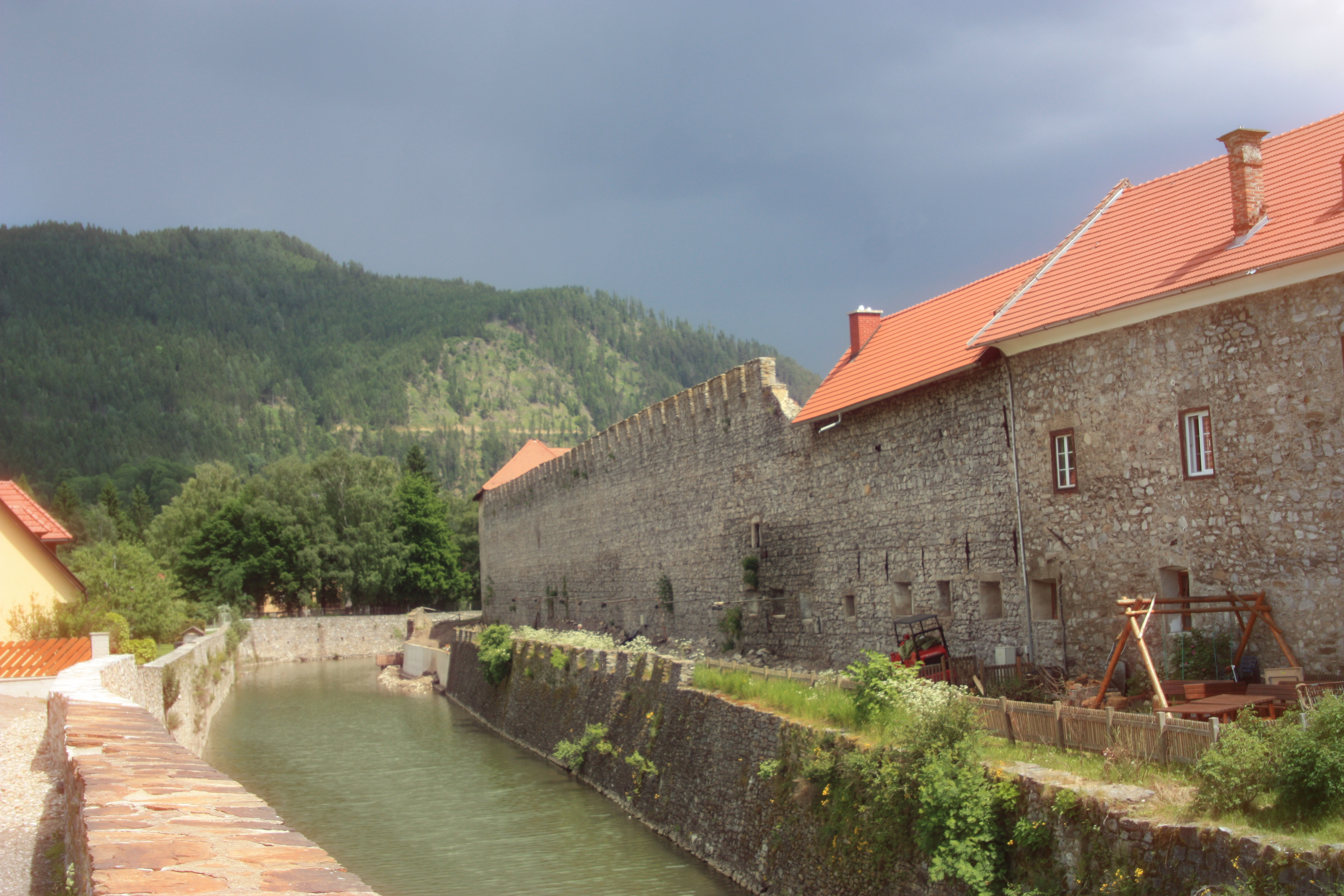
Northern moat in Friesach

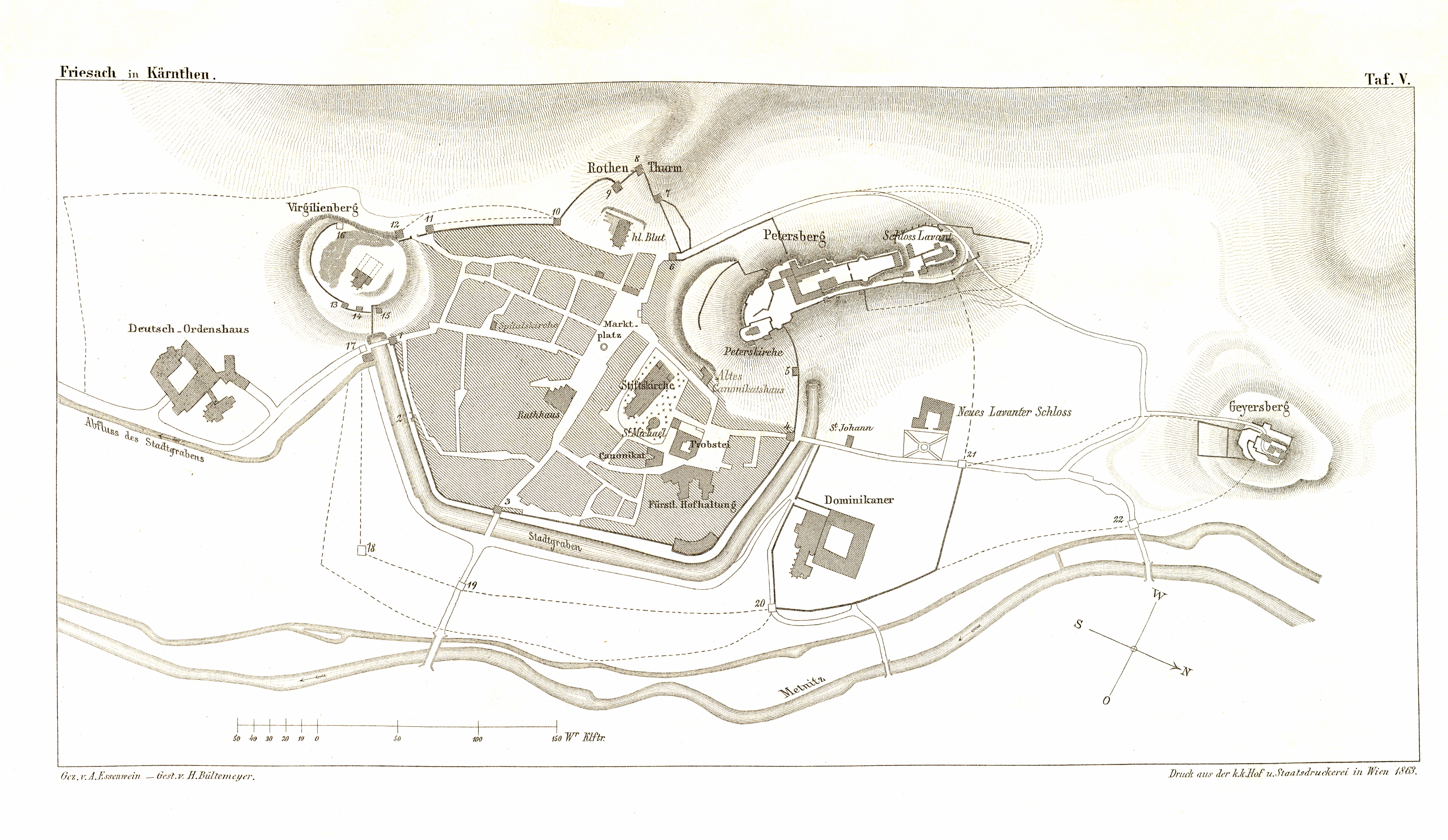
Essenwein Baudenkmale der Stadt Friesach Tafel V . Plan of defences and town layout.

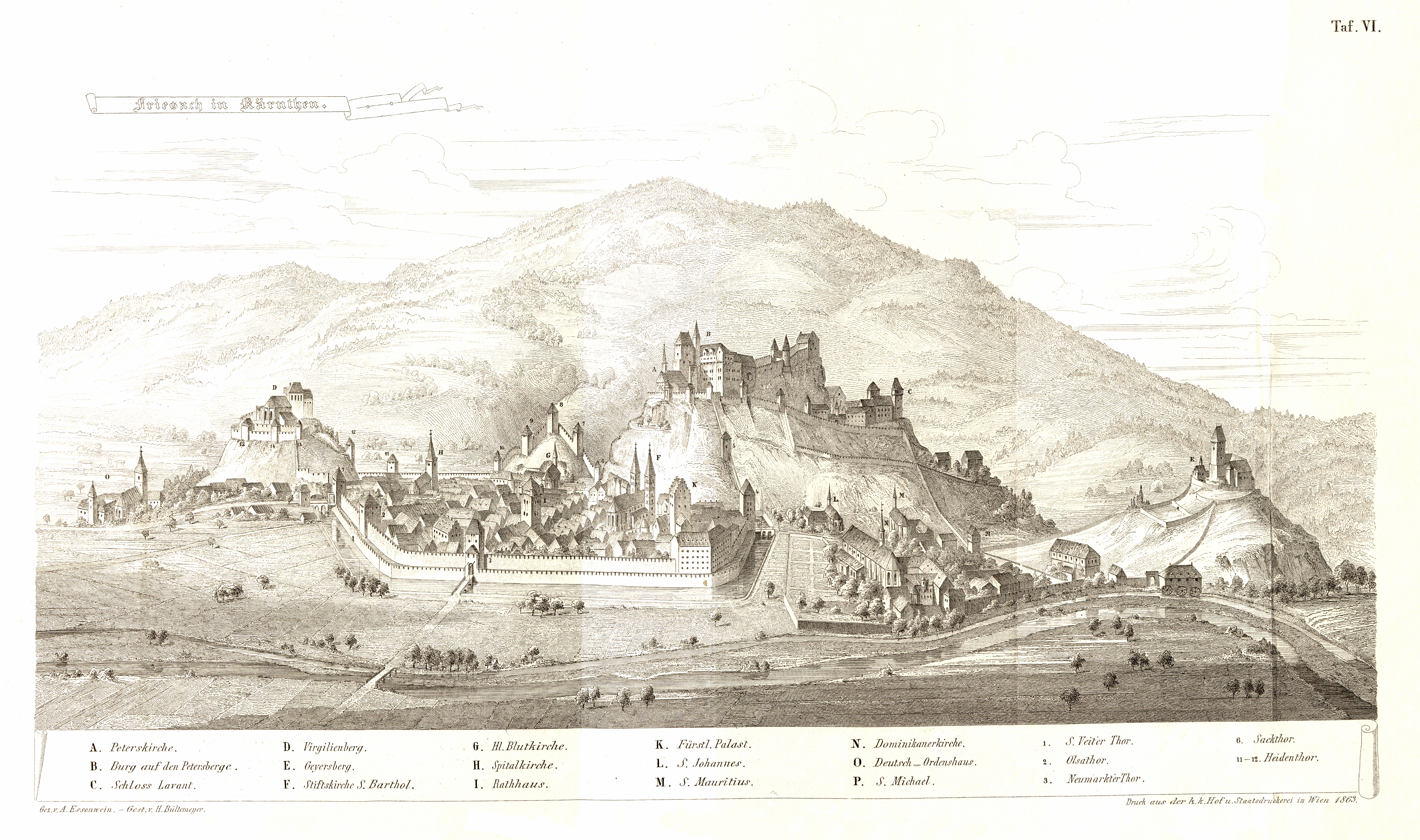
Essenwein Baudenkmale der Stadt Friesach Tafel VI View of Friesach and its defences.

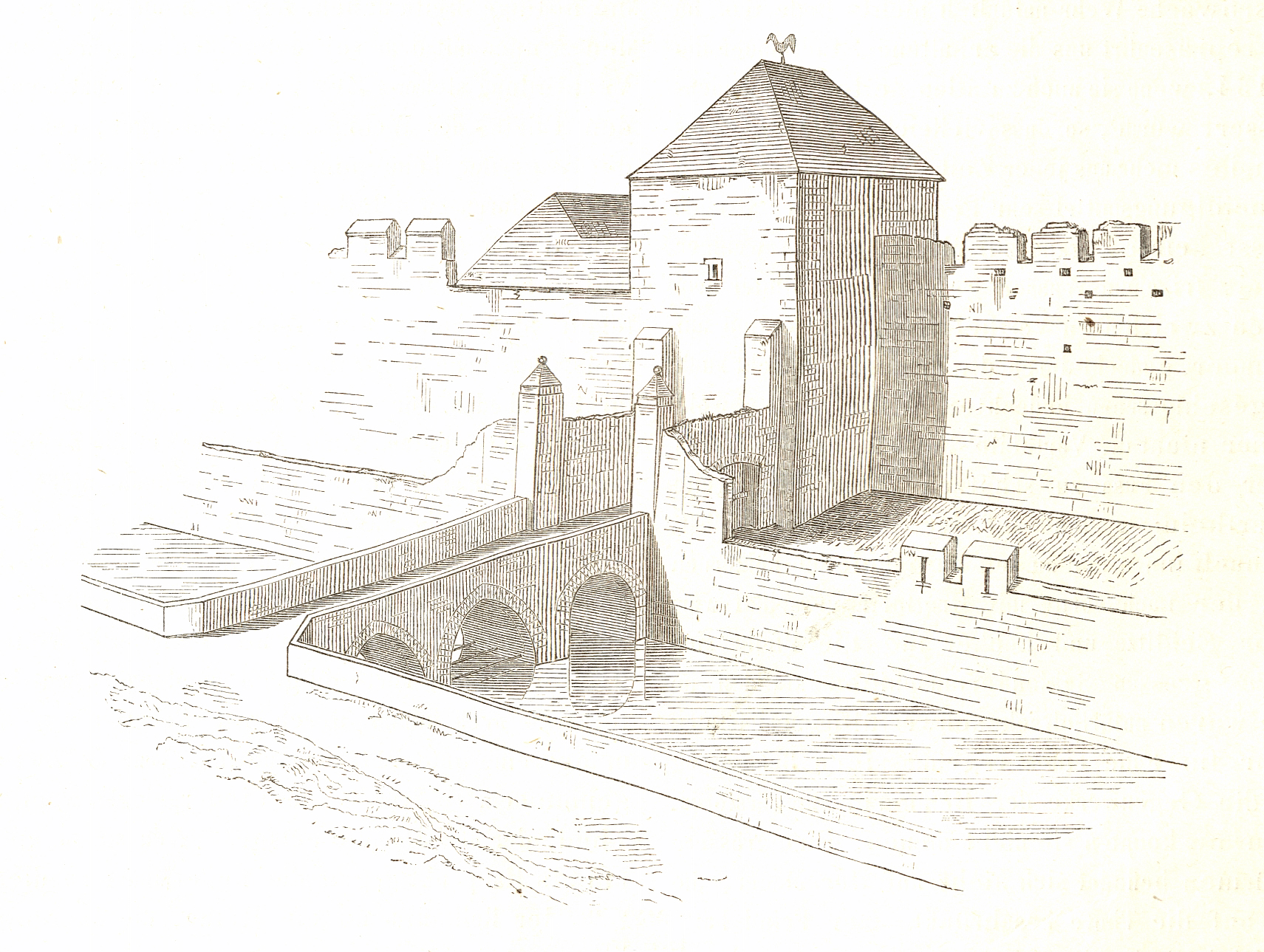
Stadt Friesach Fig. 01 Neumarkter Thor in 1863

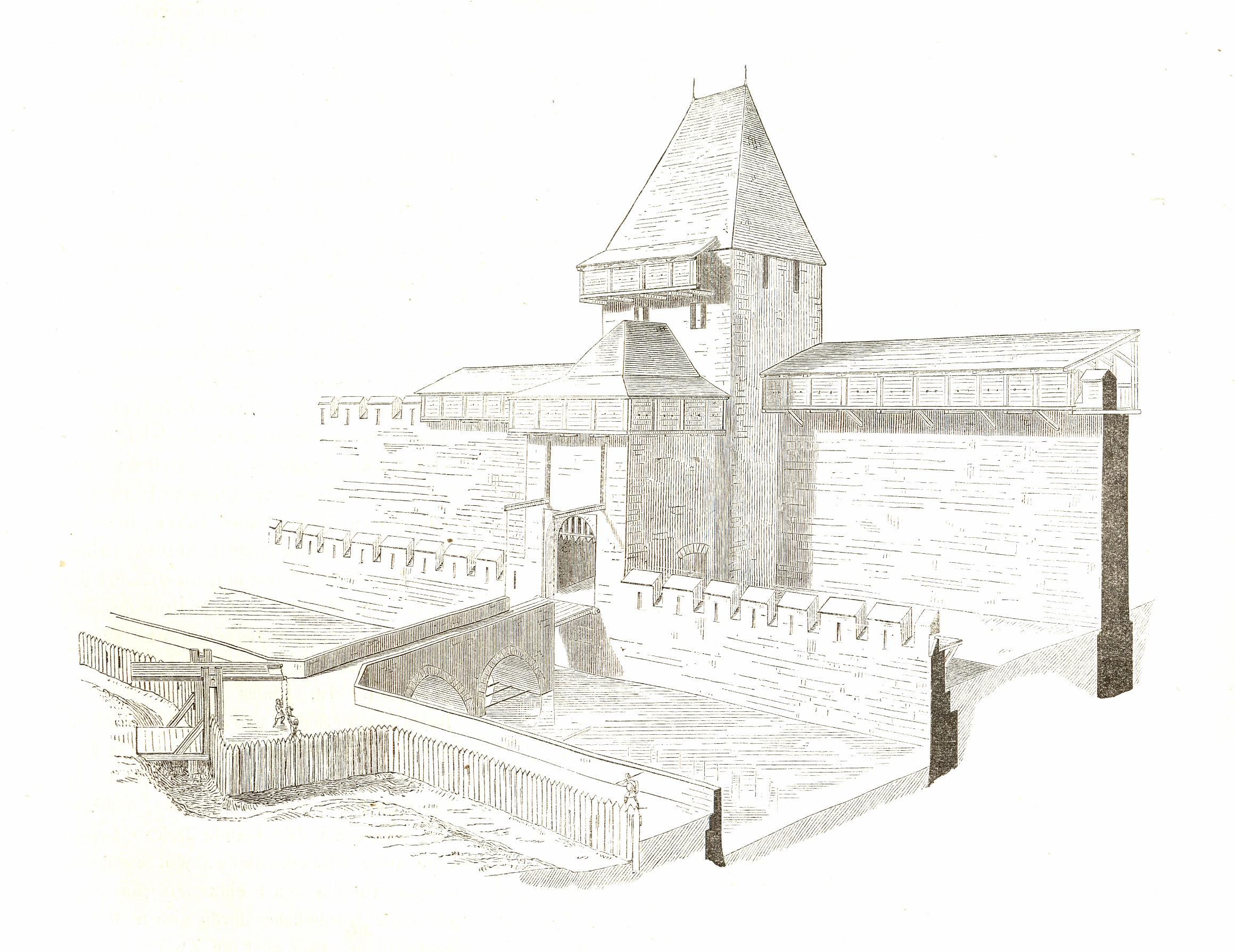
Essenwein reconstruction of the Neumarkter Thor at Friesach, showing gate with 'hourding' 'mantelmauer', moat and palisade.

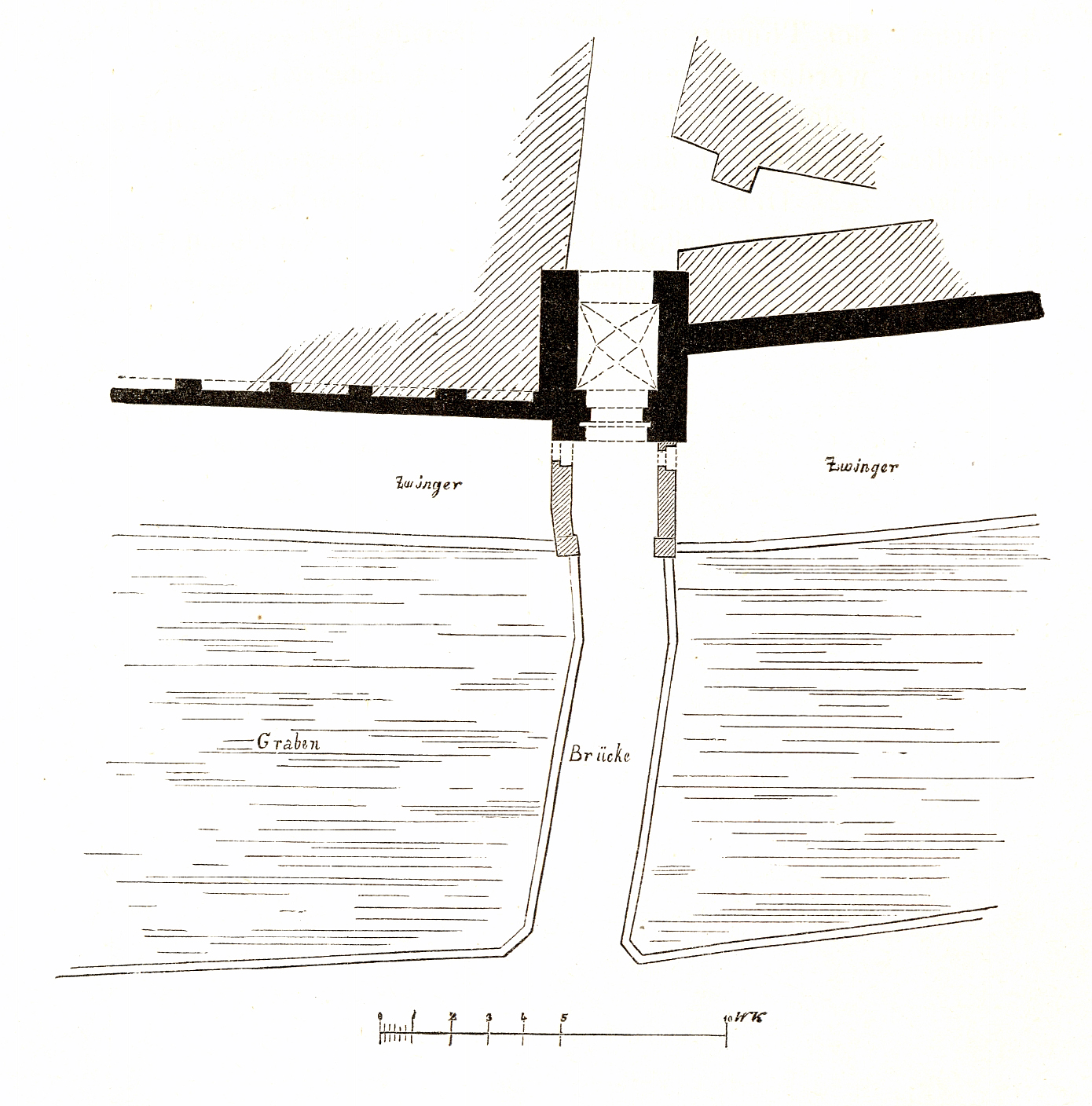
Friesach Neumarkter Thor - Ground-plan

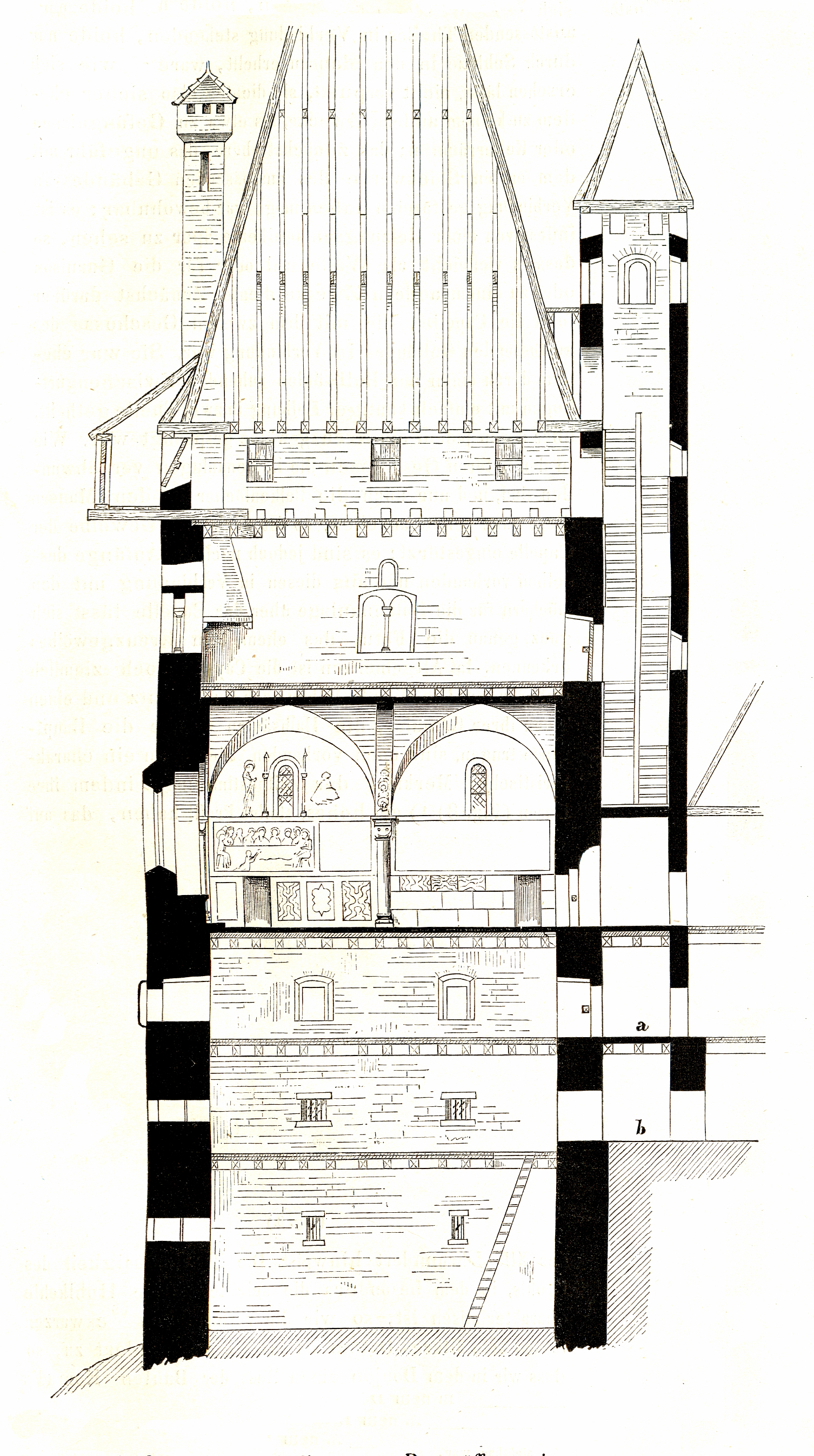
Essenwein Baudenkmale der Stadt Friesach Fig. 06 Festung Hauptturm Reconstruction showing internal floor levels.
- Gmünd in Karnten. An almost rectangular town layout with a spindle-shaped marketplace, with two gate towers at each end. The walls and four gates survive largely intact and the Alte Burg Castle is at the northern corner of the rectangle. The town received its charter from the Archbishop of Salzburg in 1346. The walled area was expanded (probably to the west) after a fire in 1504.
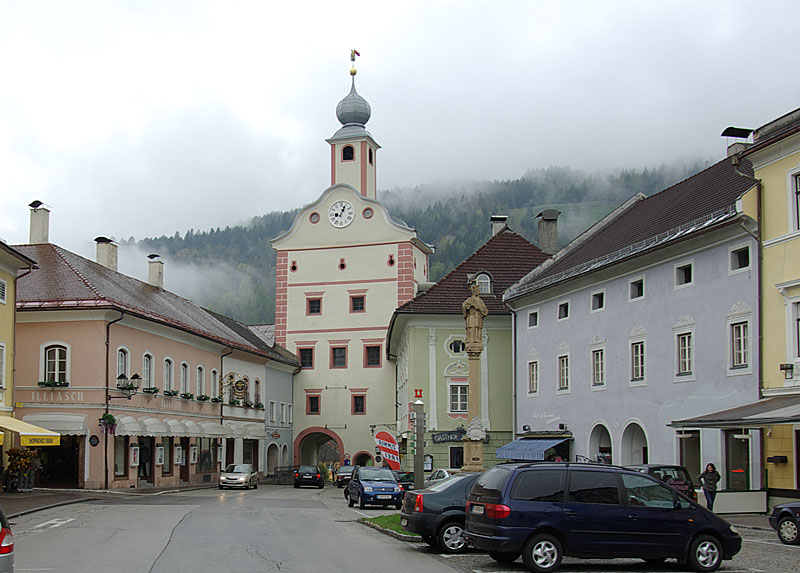
Gmünd in Kärnten

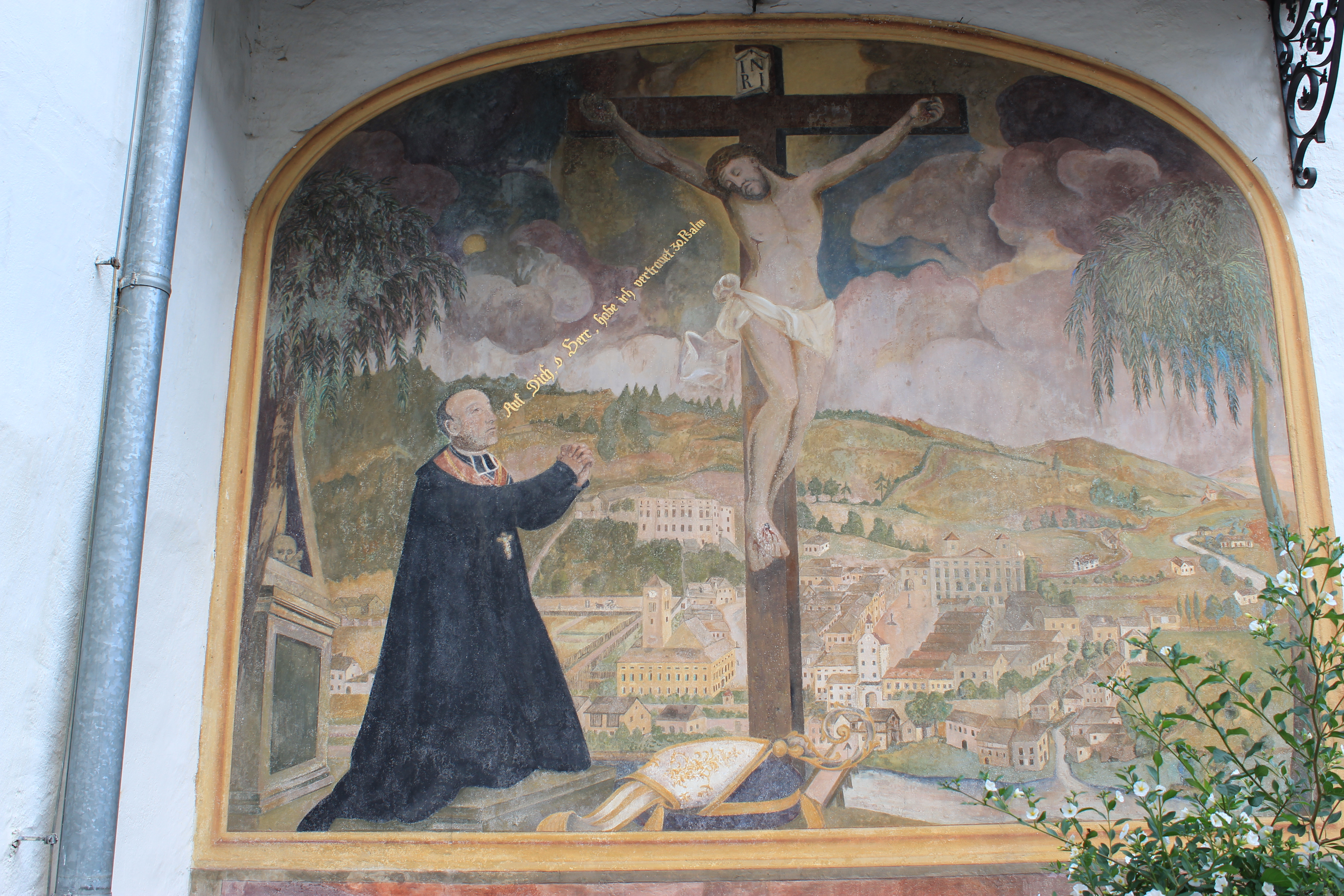
Pfarrkirche Gmünd in Kärnten -Stifterfresko

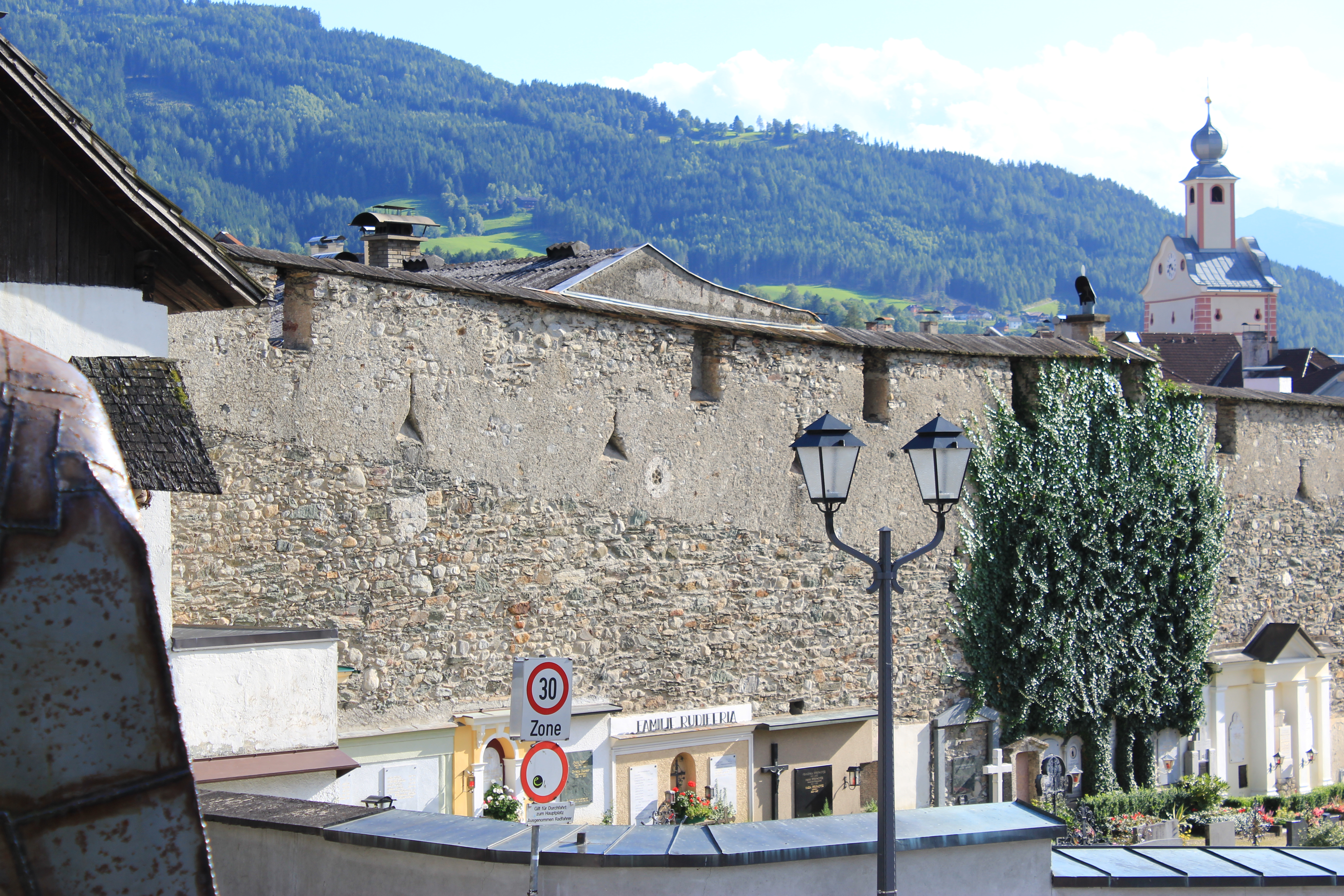
Gmünd - Stadtmauer

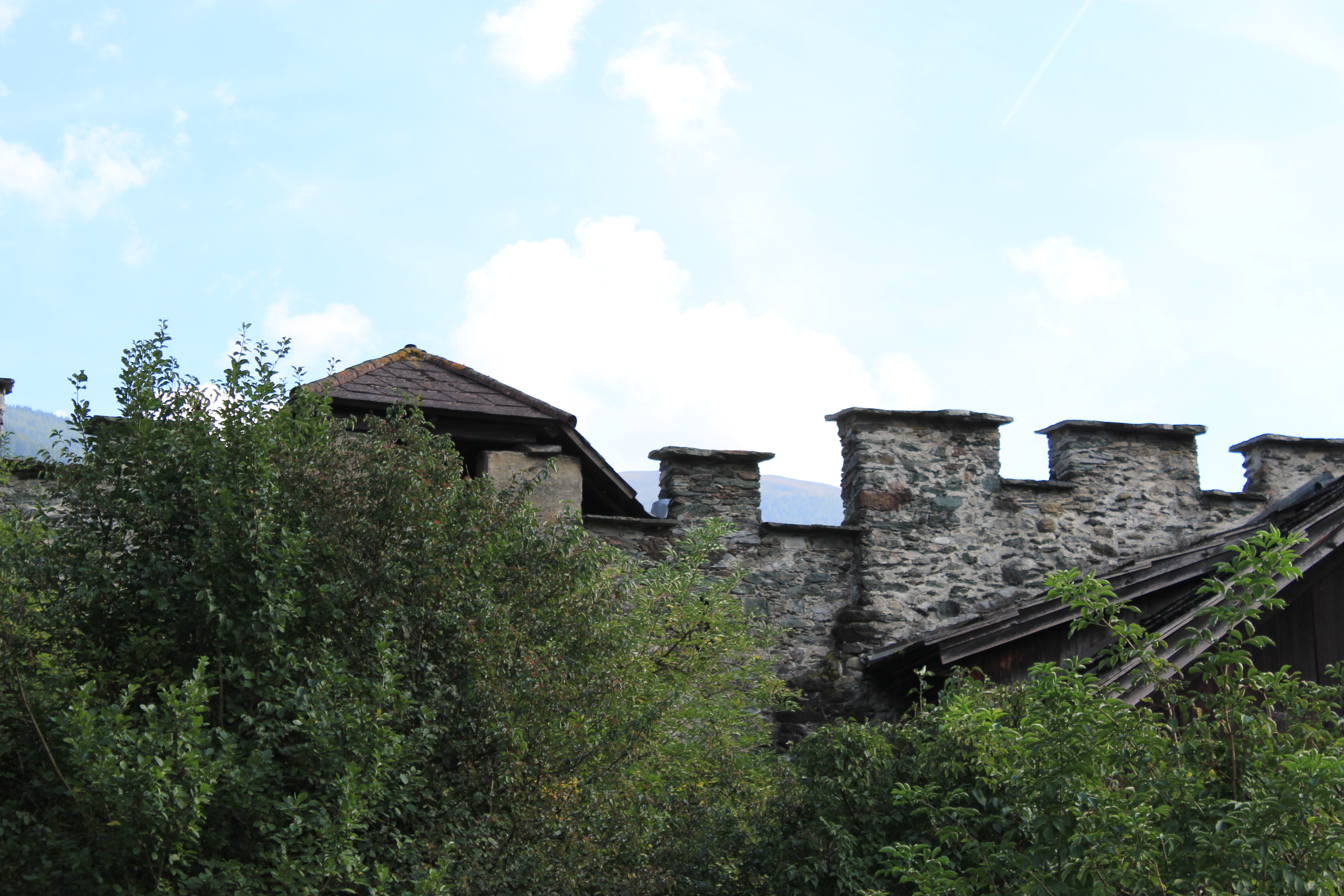
Gmünd - Stadtmauer

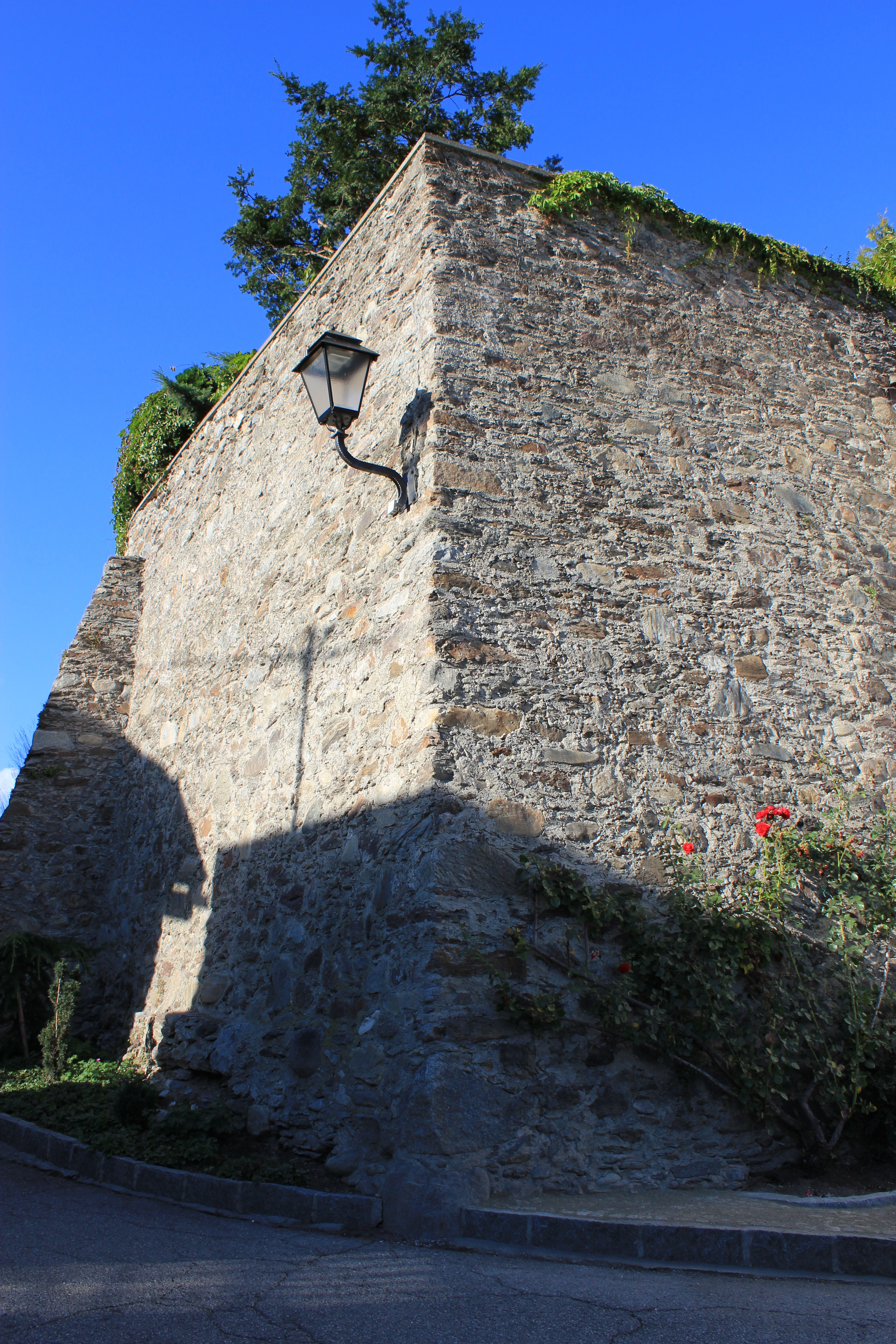
Gmünd - Stadtmauer

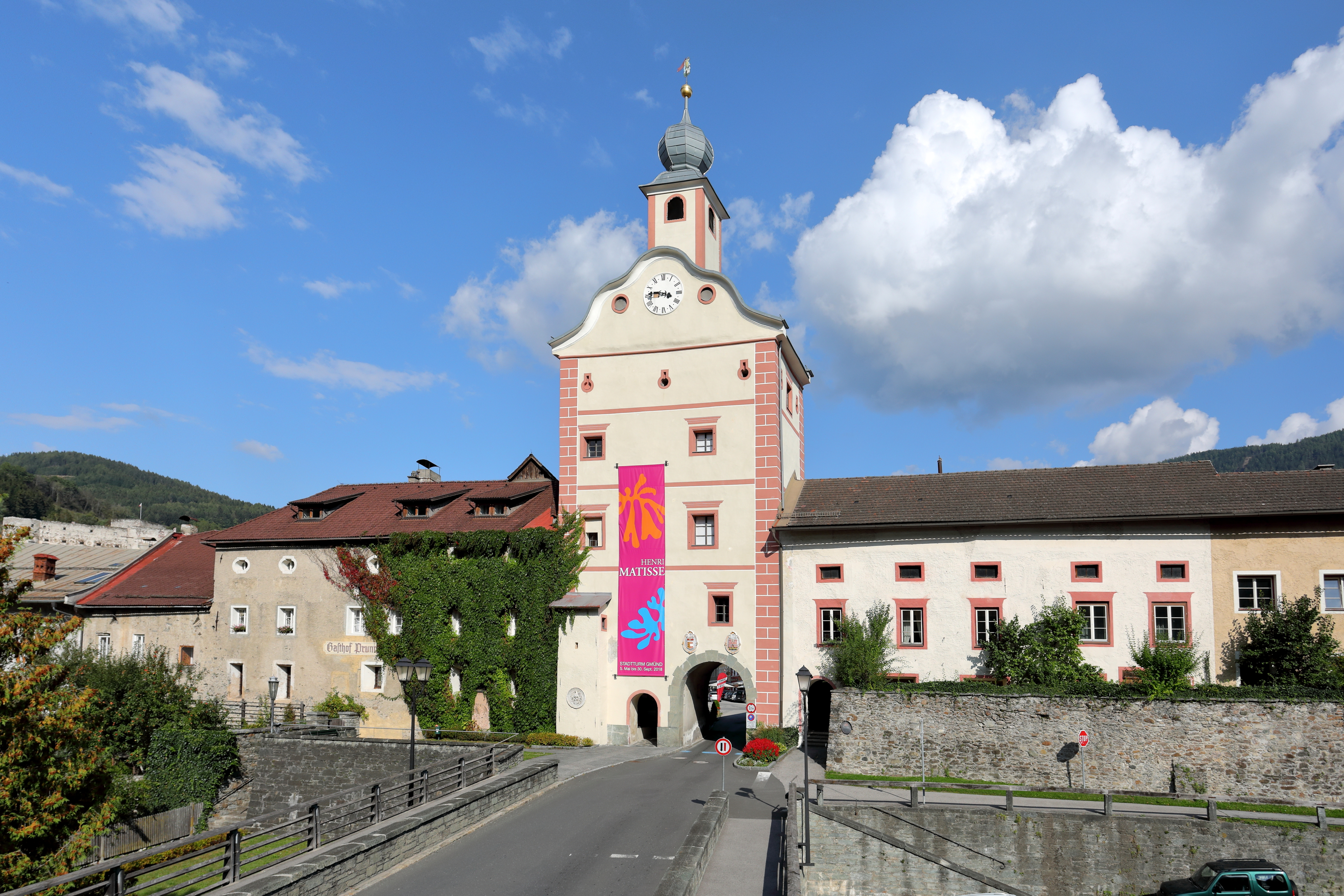
Gmünd - Unteres Tor

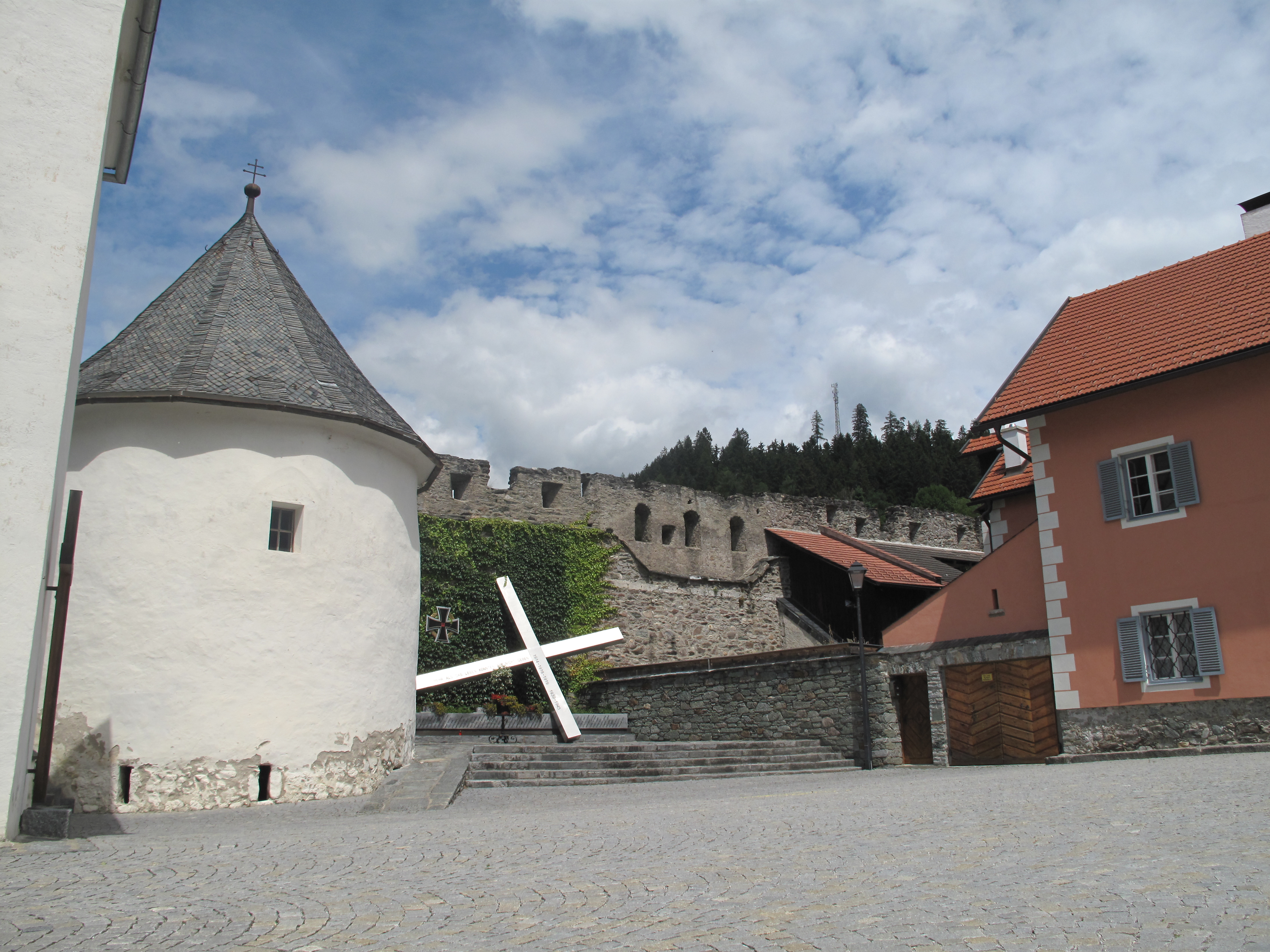
Gmünd, Inside of wall with round charnel house or Karner to left.

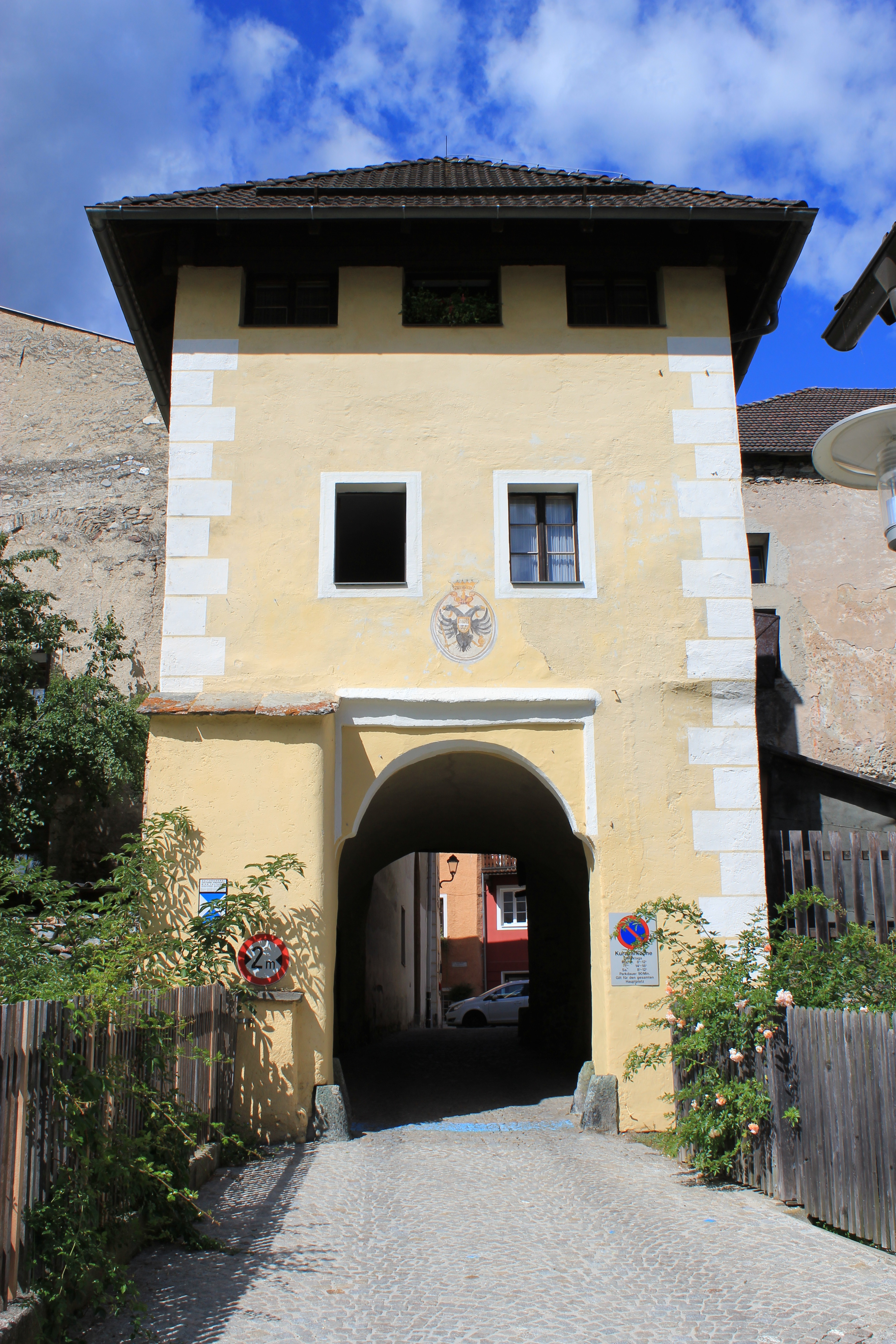
Gmünd - Pankrazitor

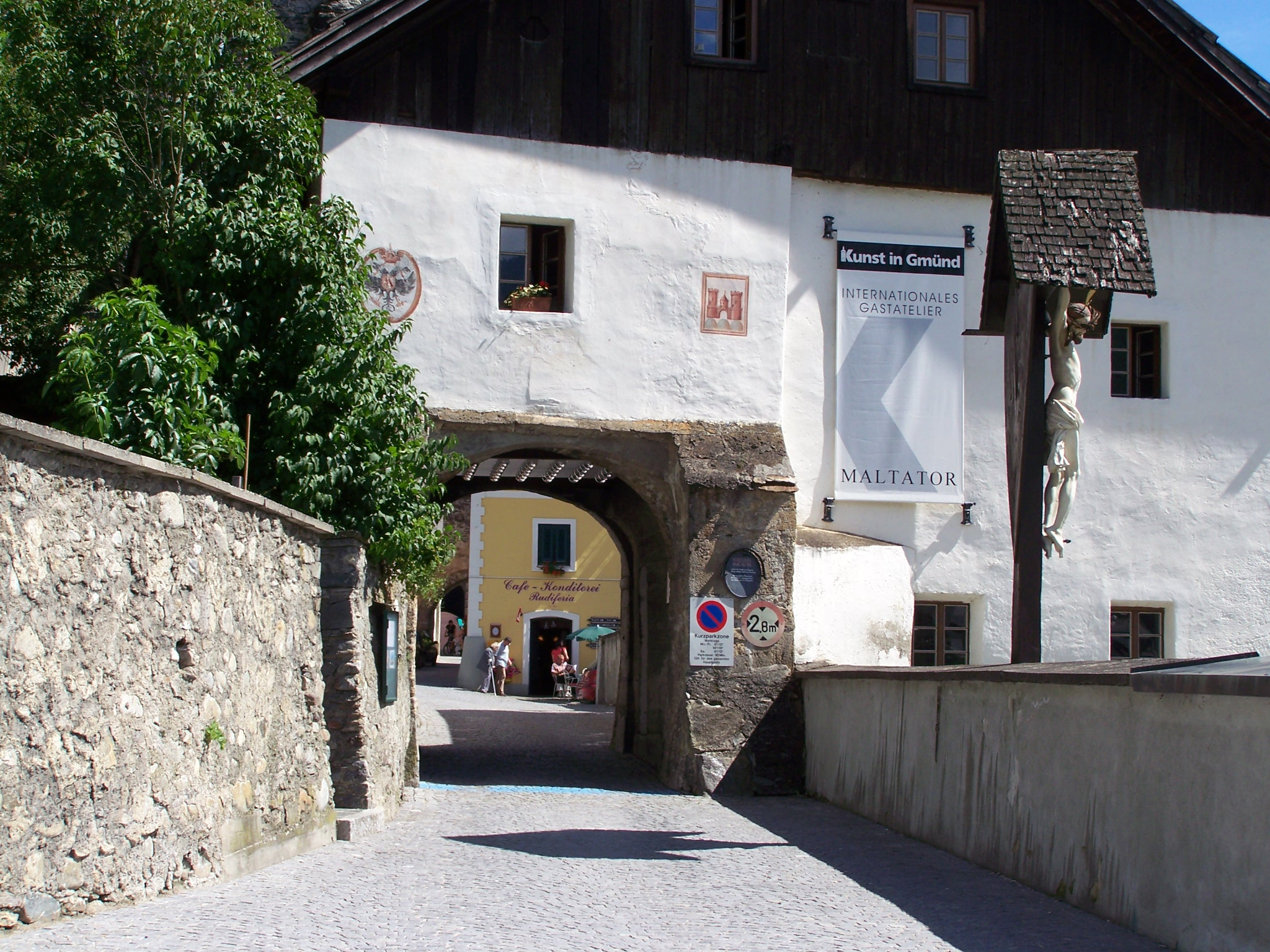
Maltator-Gmünd

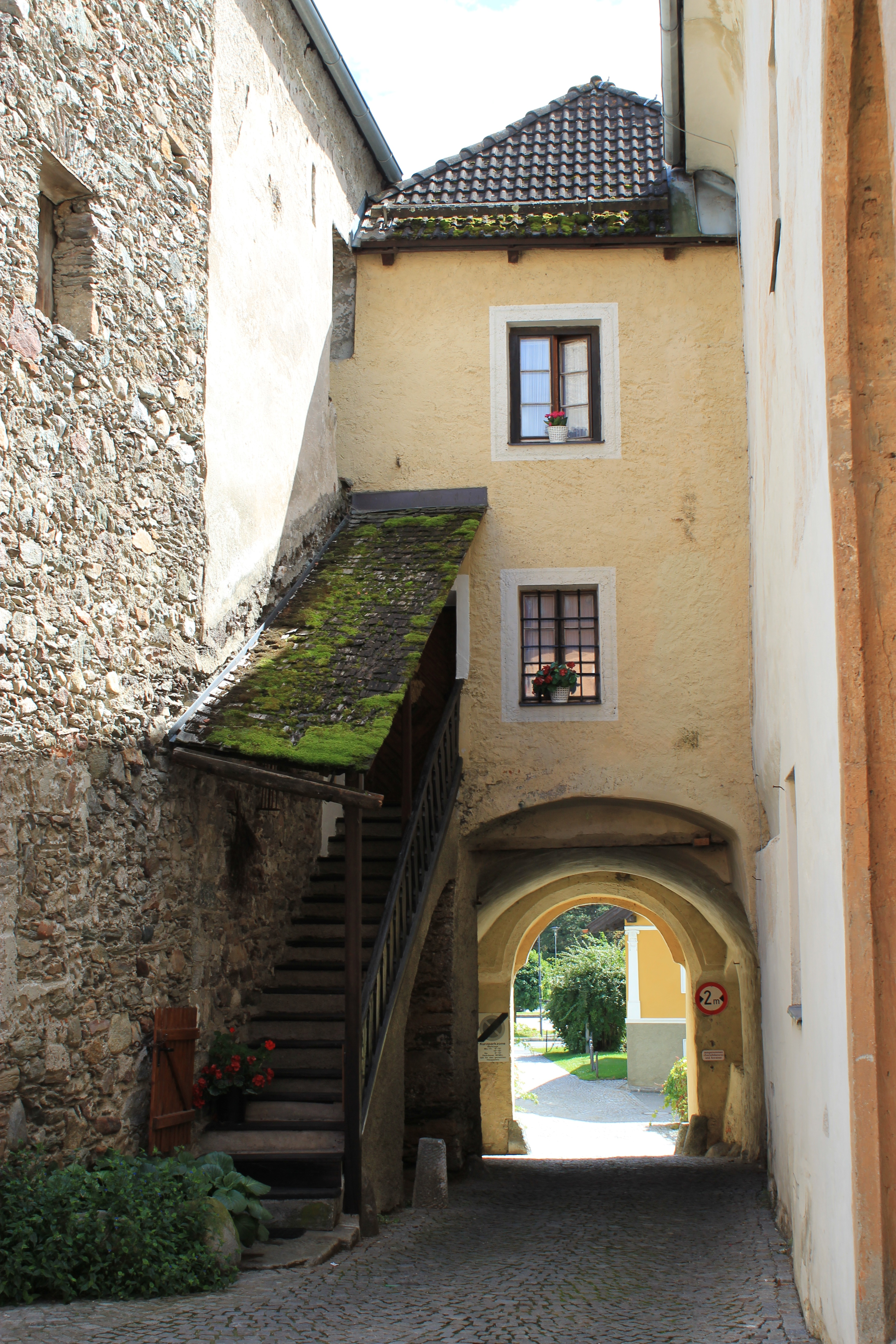
Gmünd - Pankrazitor
- Klagenfurt. The defences of Klagenfurt were largely removed in 1809, but the Merian view of 1679, shows them to have been of massive fortress construction with flanked corner bastions, and four gates with bridges over a wide moat. The Matthäus Seutter map of c. 1735 shows the fortifications had an almost lozenge-shaped layout with an interior grid plan of streets and a large rectangular marketplace.
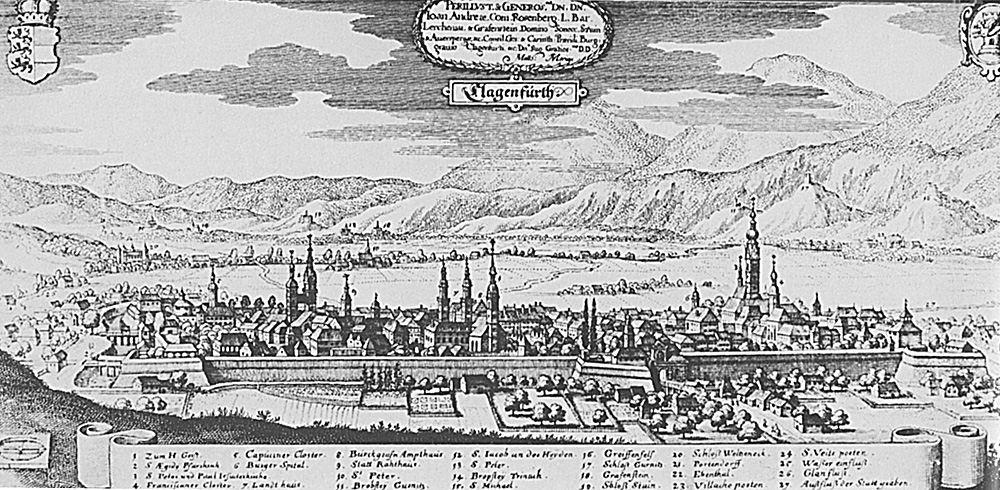
KlagenfurtMerian1649

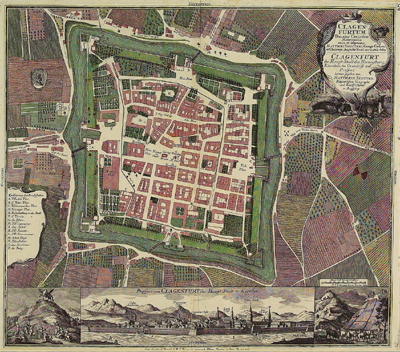
Matthäus Seutter's Klagenfurt map ca 1735

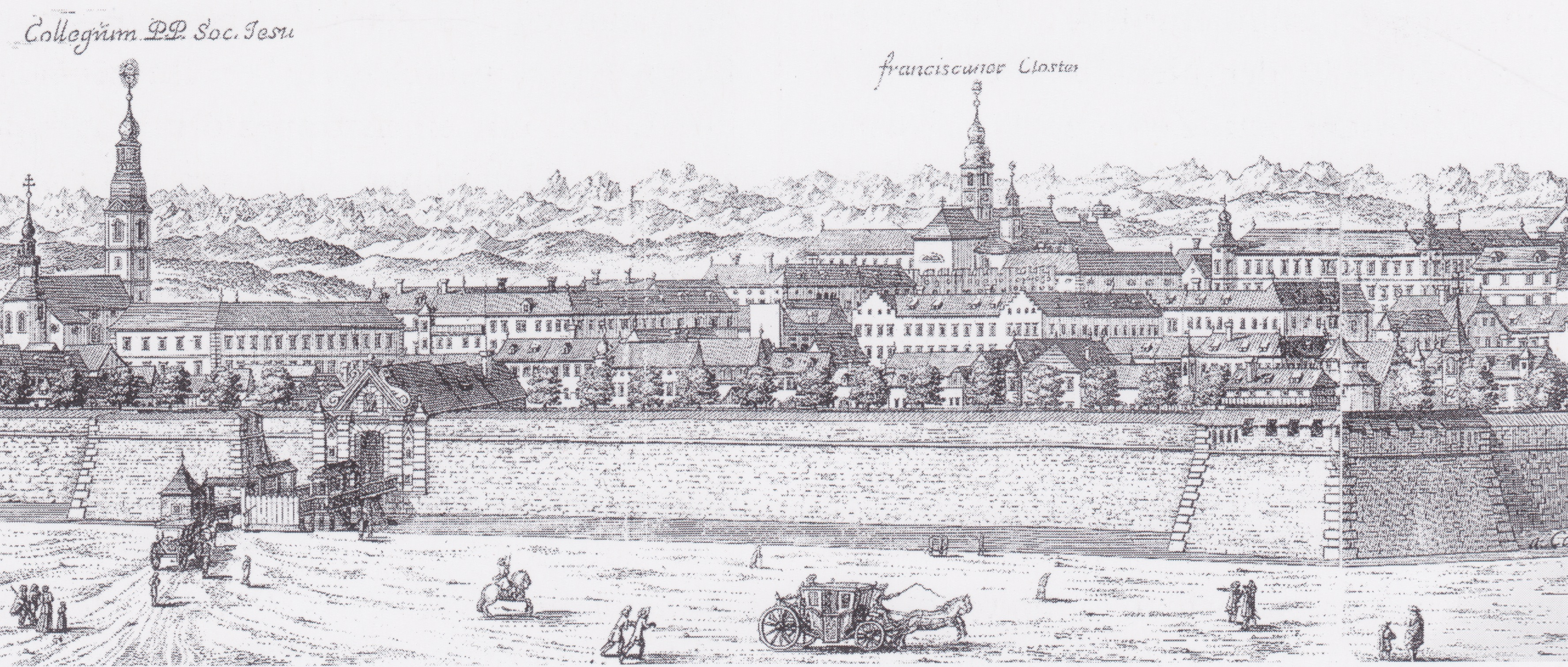
Klagenfurt from the NE after Valvasor

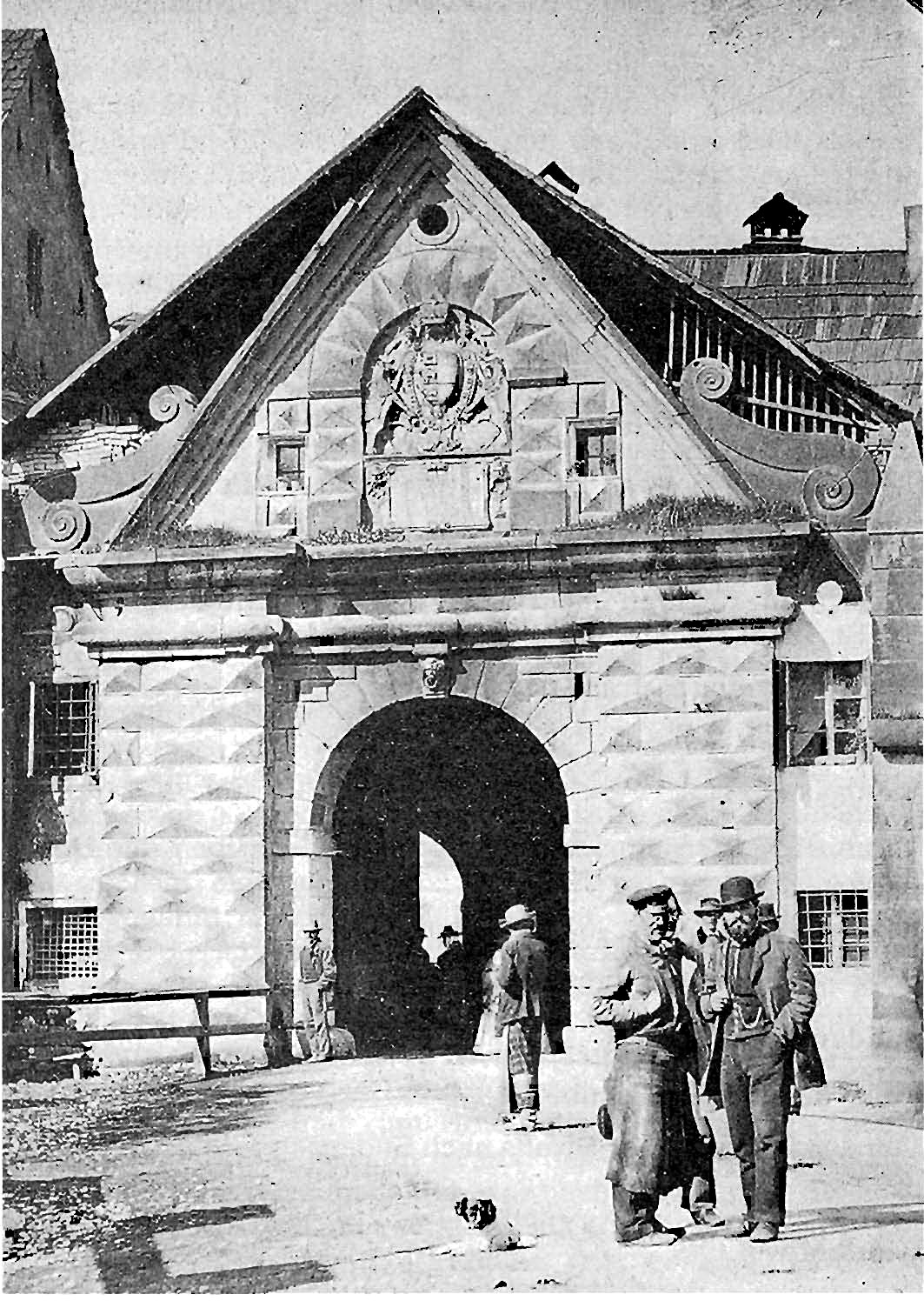
28 Klagenfurt Voelkermarkter Gate before1867

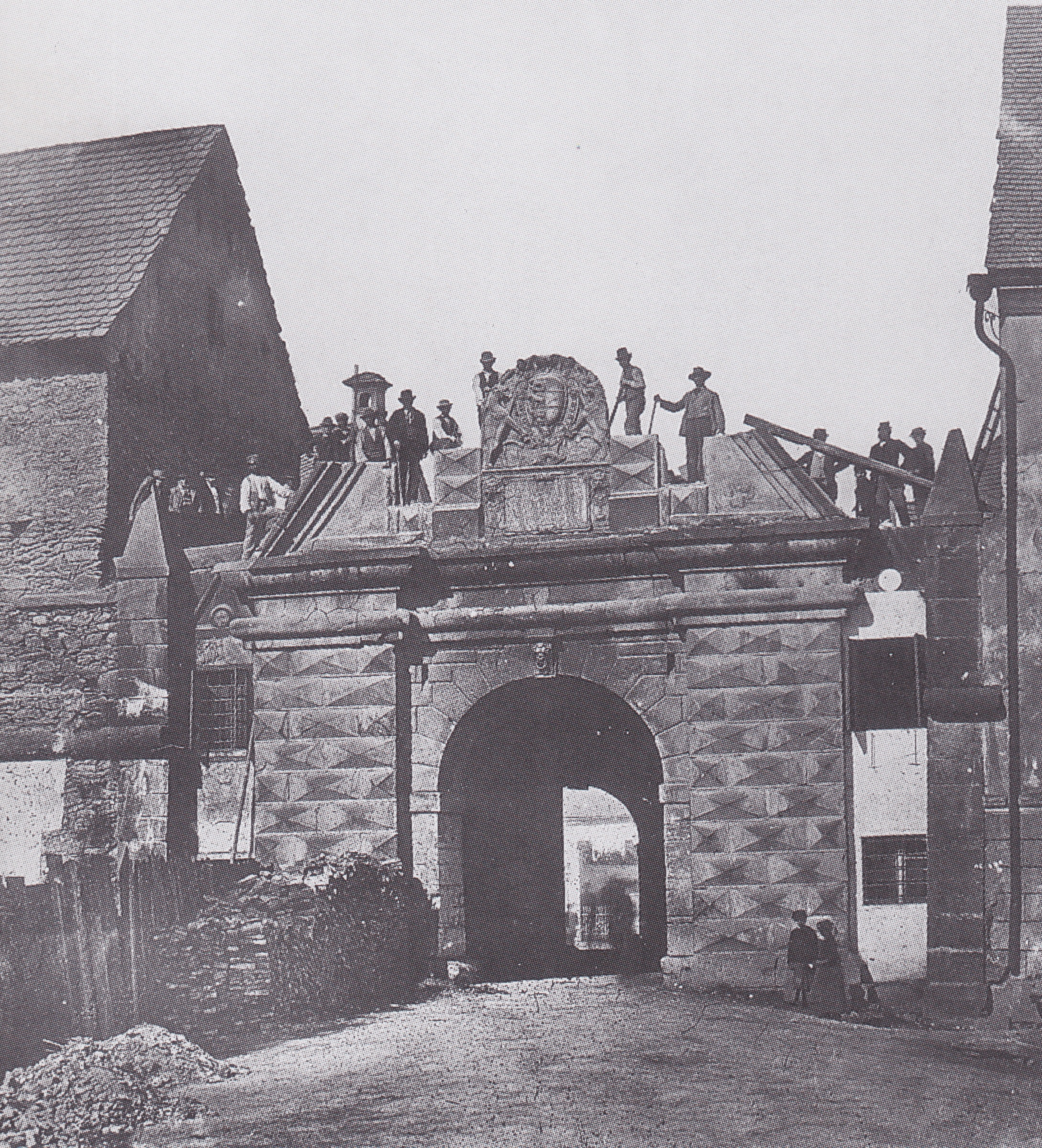
Klagenfurt -The demolition of the Völkermarkter Gate - 1867

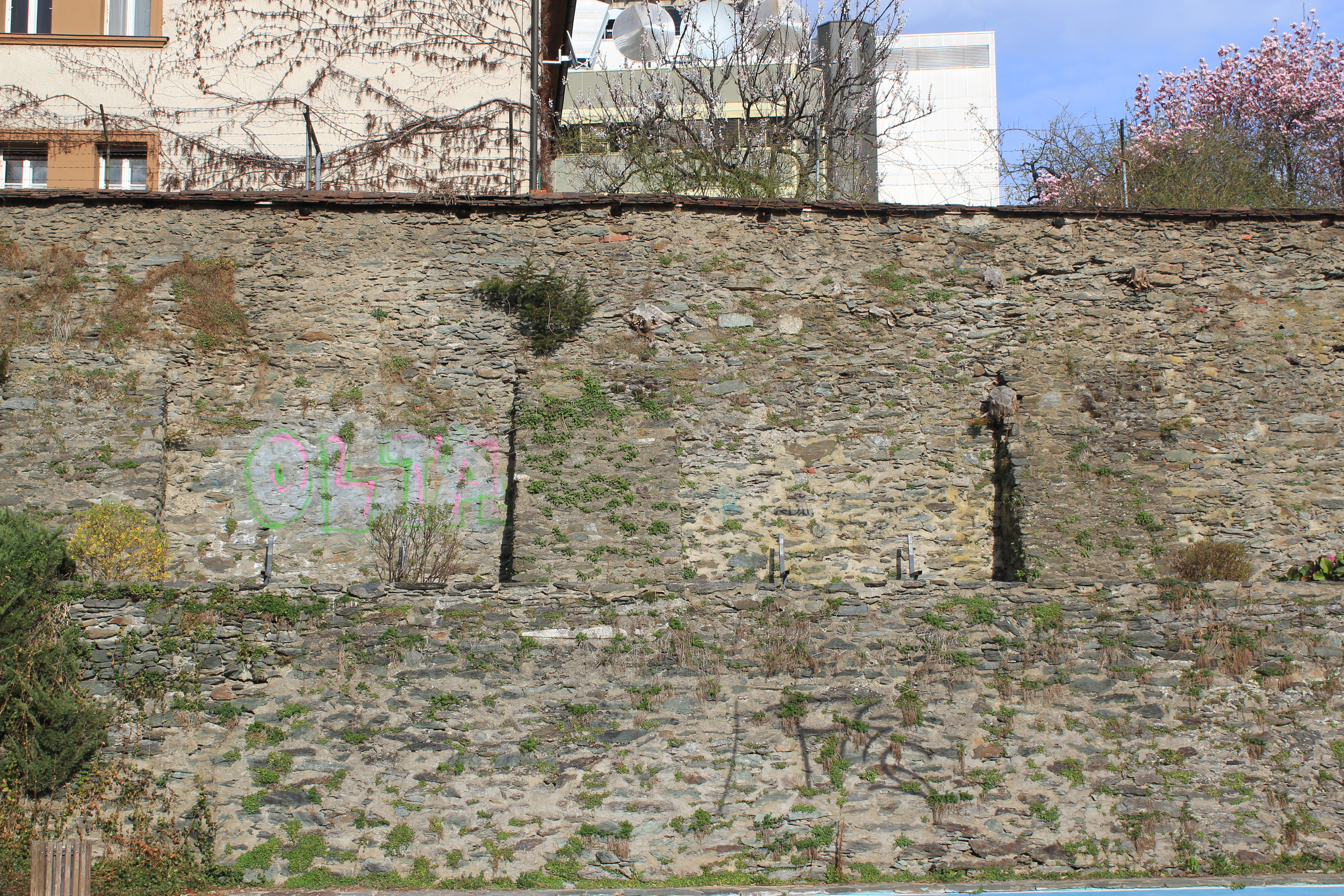
Klagenfurt - Town Walls (Villacher Ring)

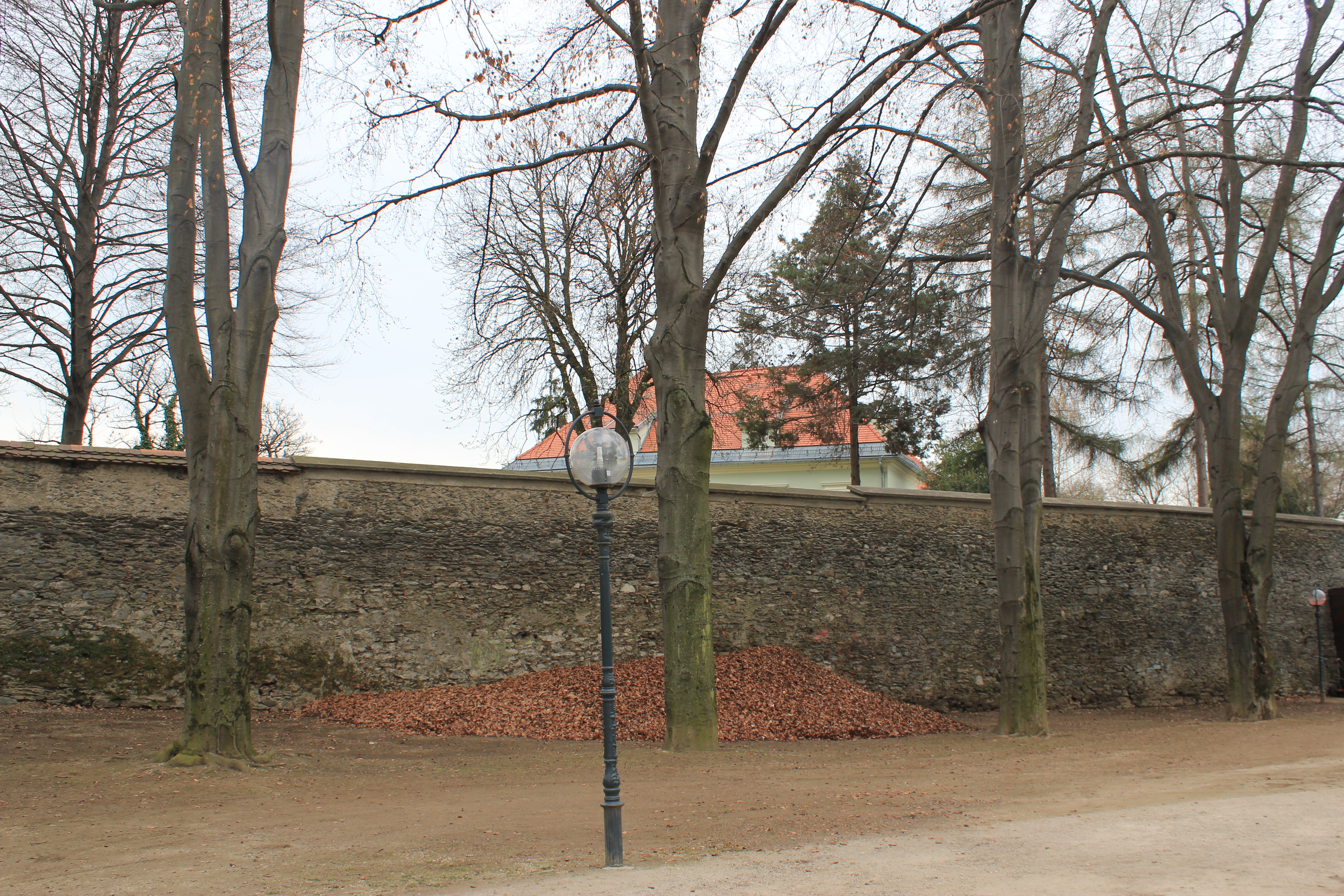
Klagenfurt, Town Walls Theaterplatz

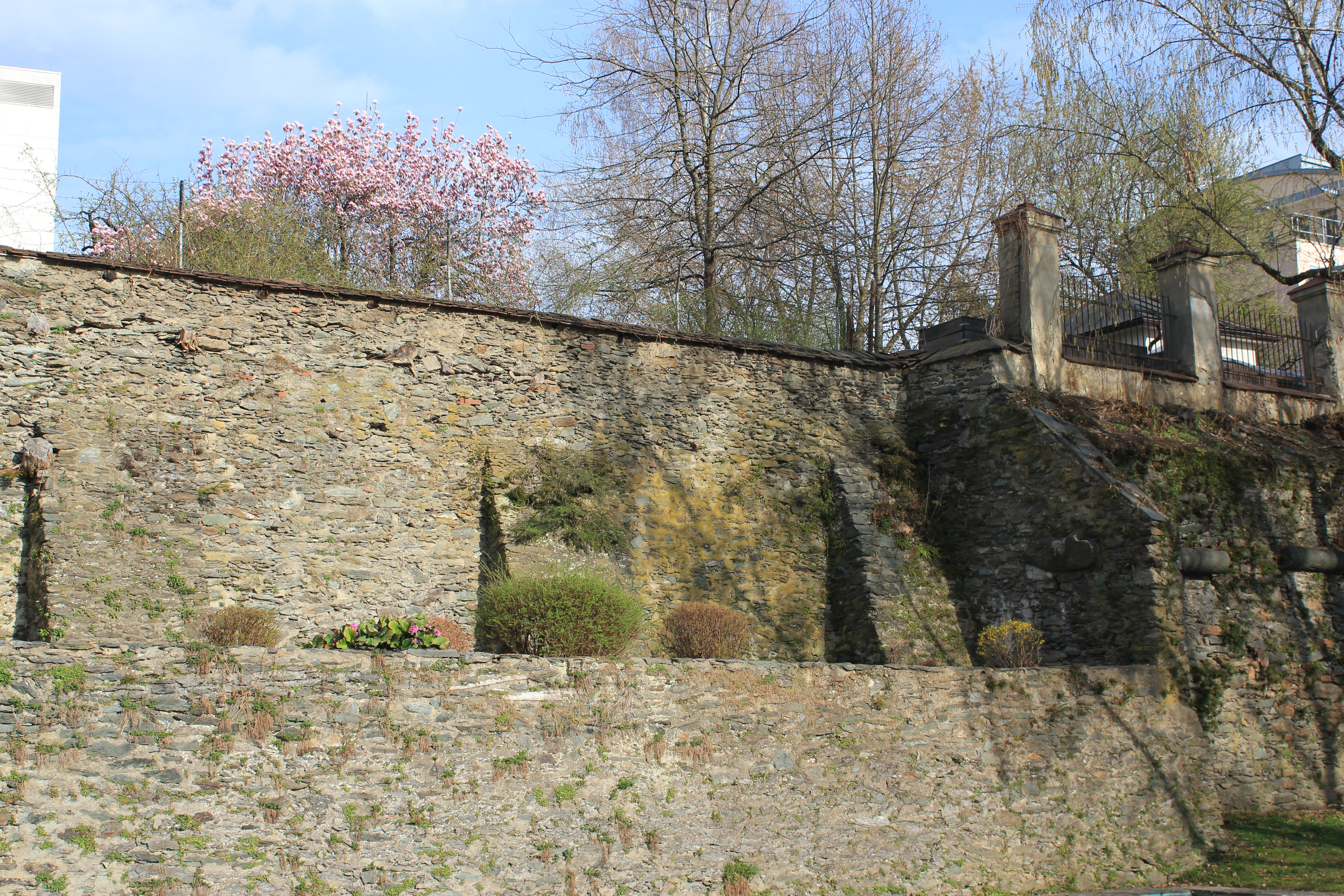
Klagenfurt - Town Walls (Villacher Ring)

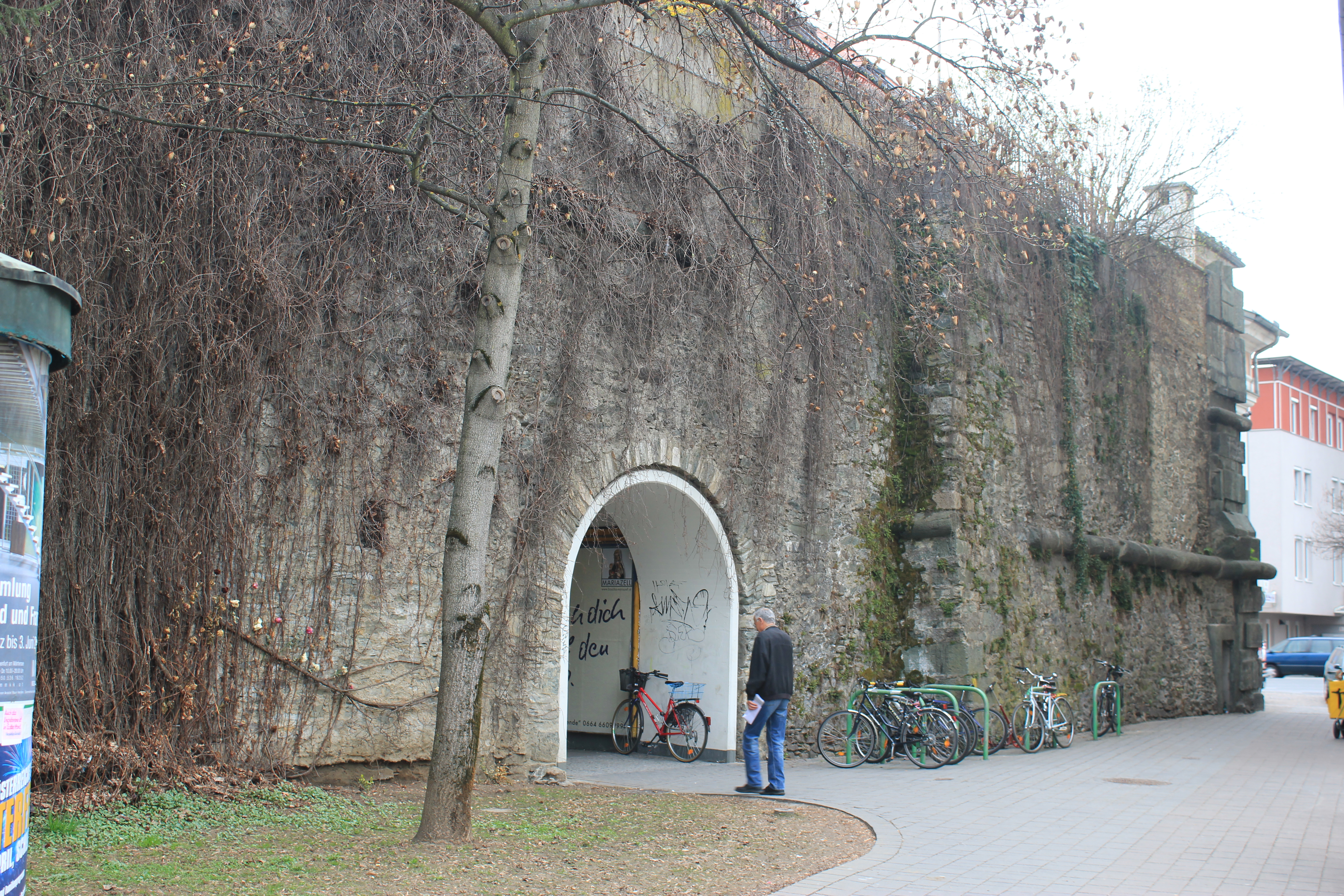
Klagenfurt, Town Walls Stauderplatz

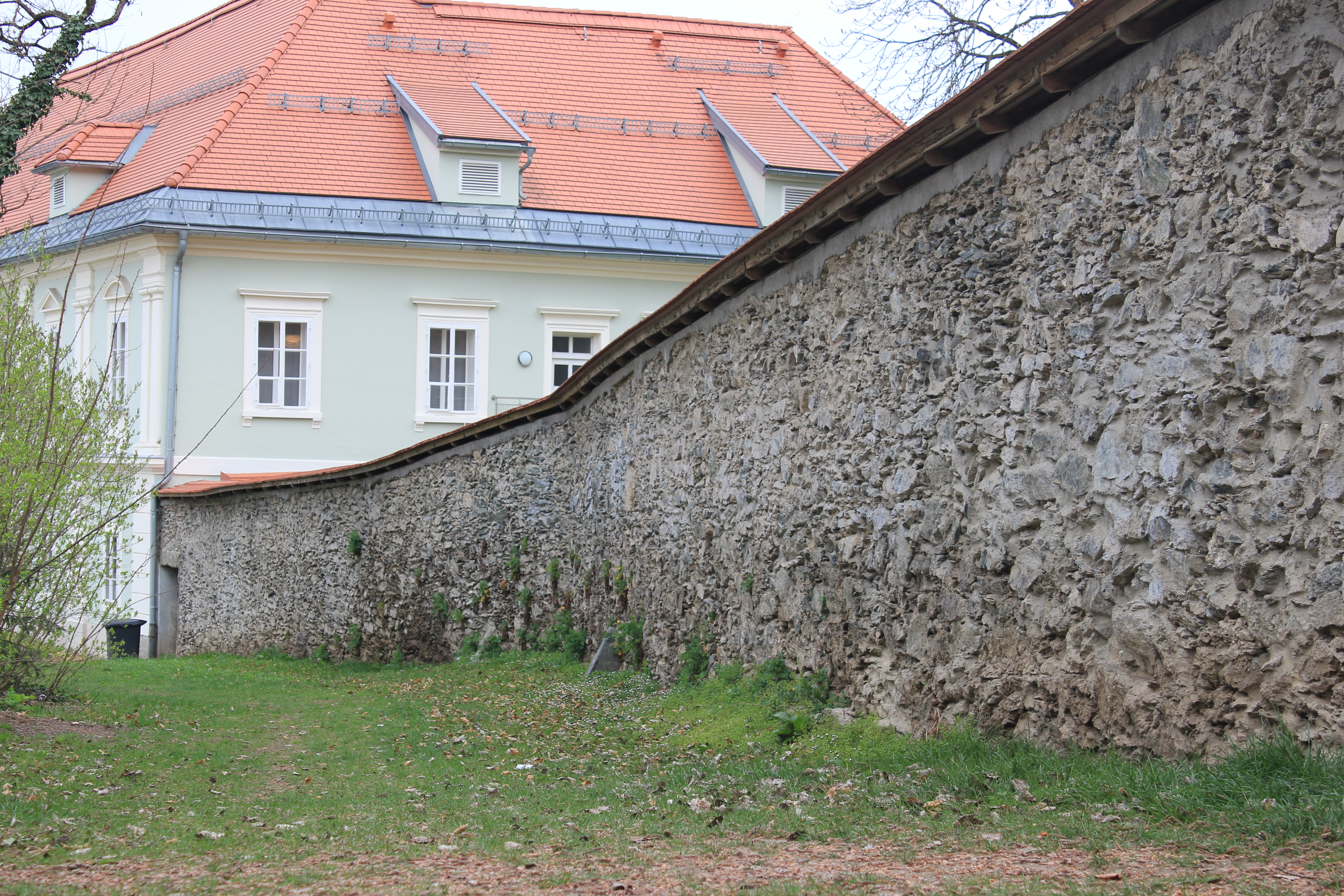
Klagenfurt, Town Walls Theaterplatz
- Oberdrauburg. The settlement was sited on the Roman road, Via Claudia Augusta, between Aquileia and Aguntum. The castle was first mentioned in 1240 and in 1292 became part of Görzer or Gorizia. In 1325 granted marktrect. The print by Johann Weikhard von Valvasor shows that Oberdrauberg was walled, but no walls now appear to survive.
- Sankt Andrä. Most of the walls shown in Merian's print of 1679 have largely disappeared but two gateways remain.
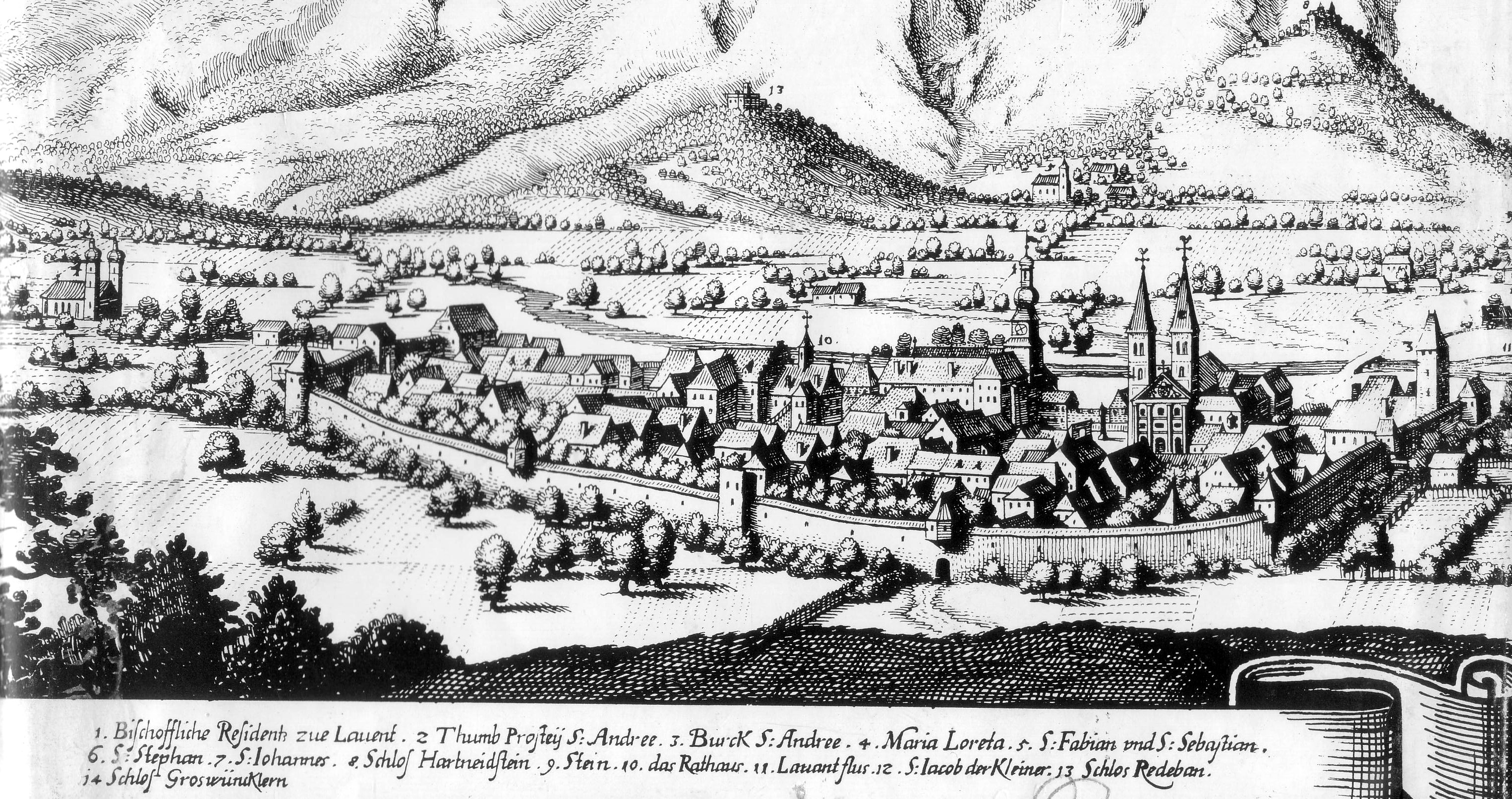
Sankt Andrä, illustrated by Merian

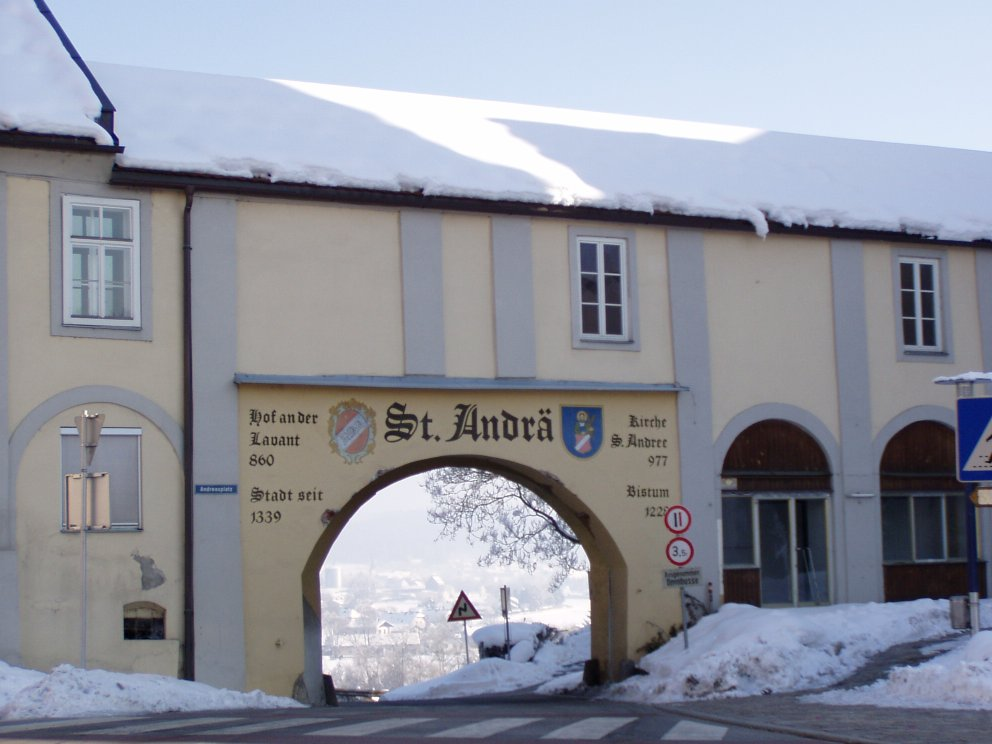
Sankt Andrä Lavanttal Stadttor

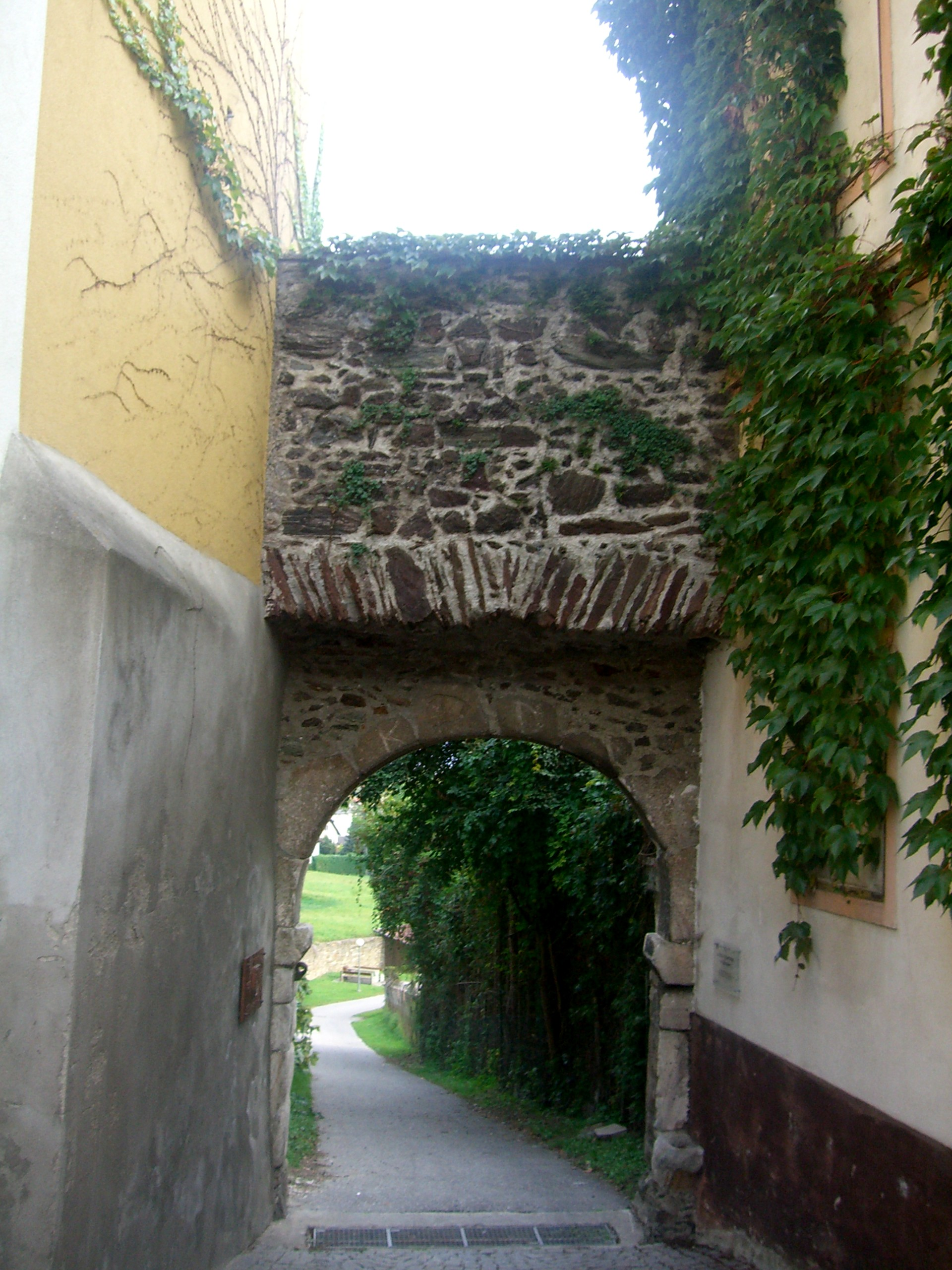
Stadttor Sankt Andrä

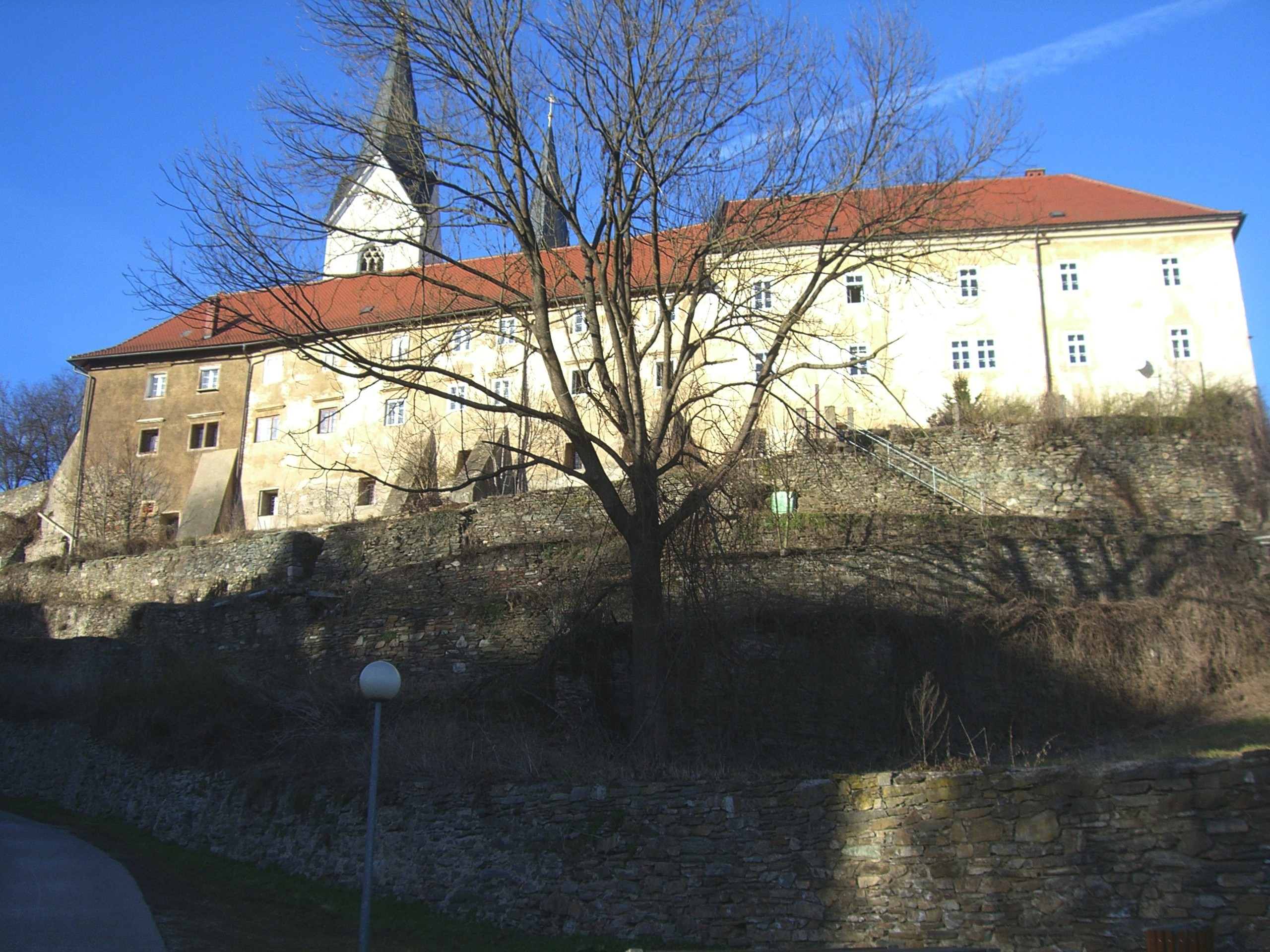
Stadtmauer Sankt Andrä
- St Veit an der Glan. Rectangular layout with the inner walls largely surviving, but the four gate towers were demolished between 1851 and 1890. The inner wall had small parapet towers set into it. The outer wall had demi-lune bastions and at the northwest and southwest corners were two large roundel towers. northwest blockhouse tower still survives and there was an outer moat. There is a long rectangular marketplace and the town and its defences appear to have been extended to the northeast from the marketplace, probably at the end of the 12th century, when the Dukes of Carinthia built their palace in the northeast corner of the town.
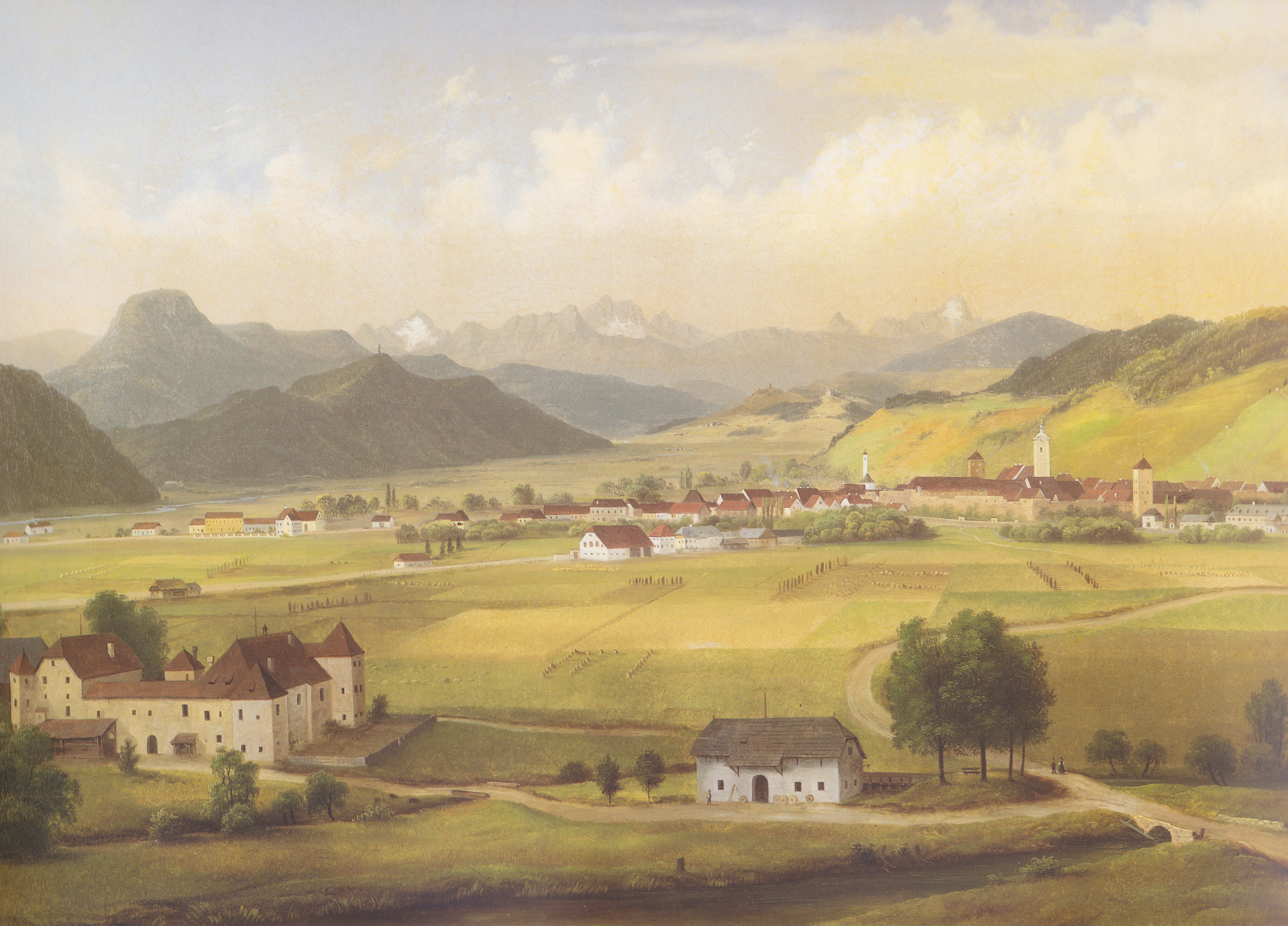
Markus Pernhart - St Veit mit Ulrichsberg

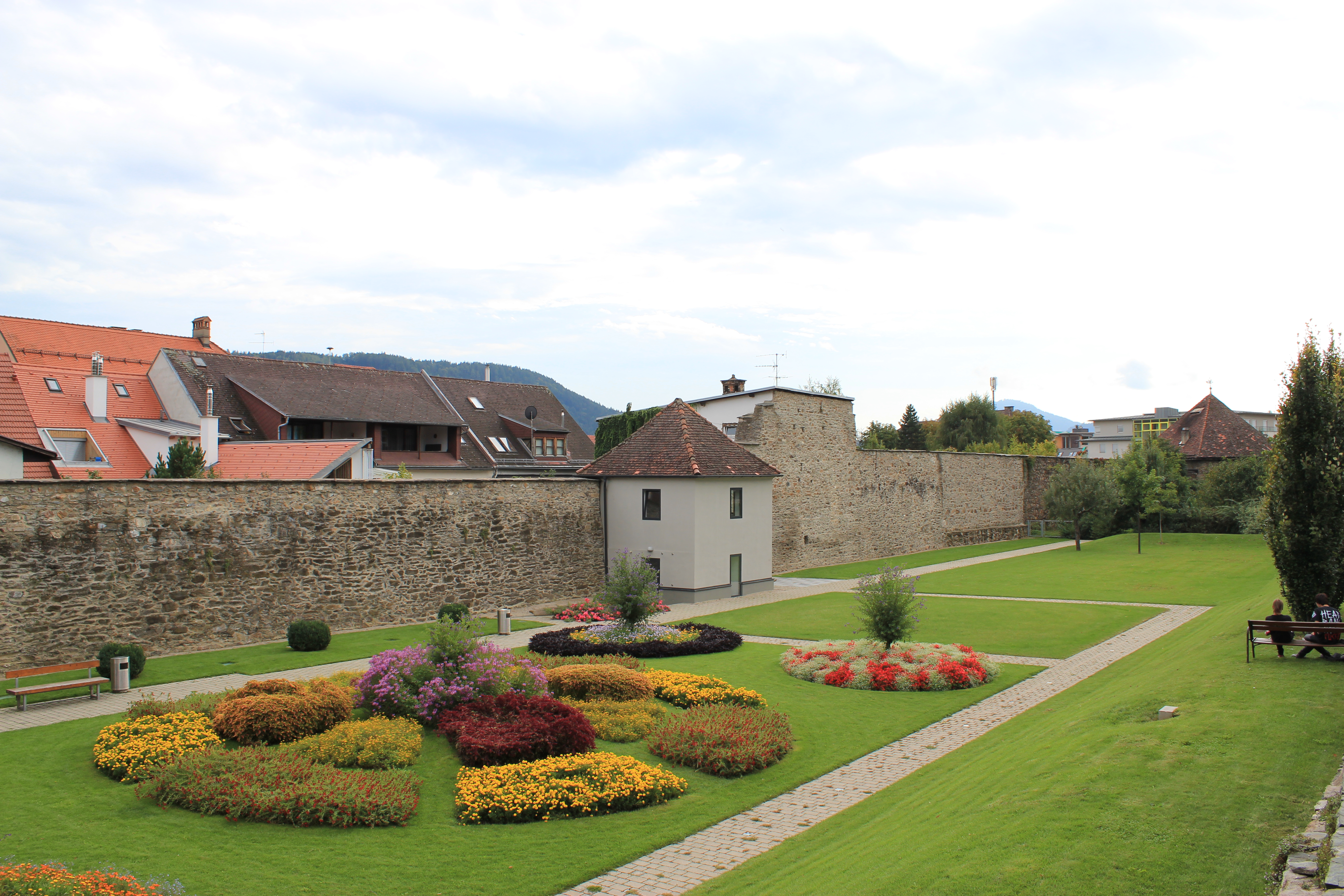
St. Veit an der Glan -Walls on N side
- Sachsenburg. First mentioned in 1213. Close to the confluence of the river Drava with the Mölltal. Noted as a market in 1326 and walls had been built by 1358. A territory of the Archbishop of Salzburg until 1803. Valvasor shows the town with a simple wall, with equally spaced keyhole gunports. There were three gates. The walls were partly demolished in by French Troops in the Napoleonic Wars.
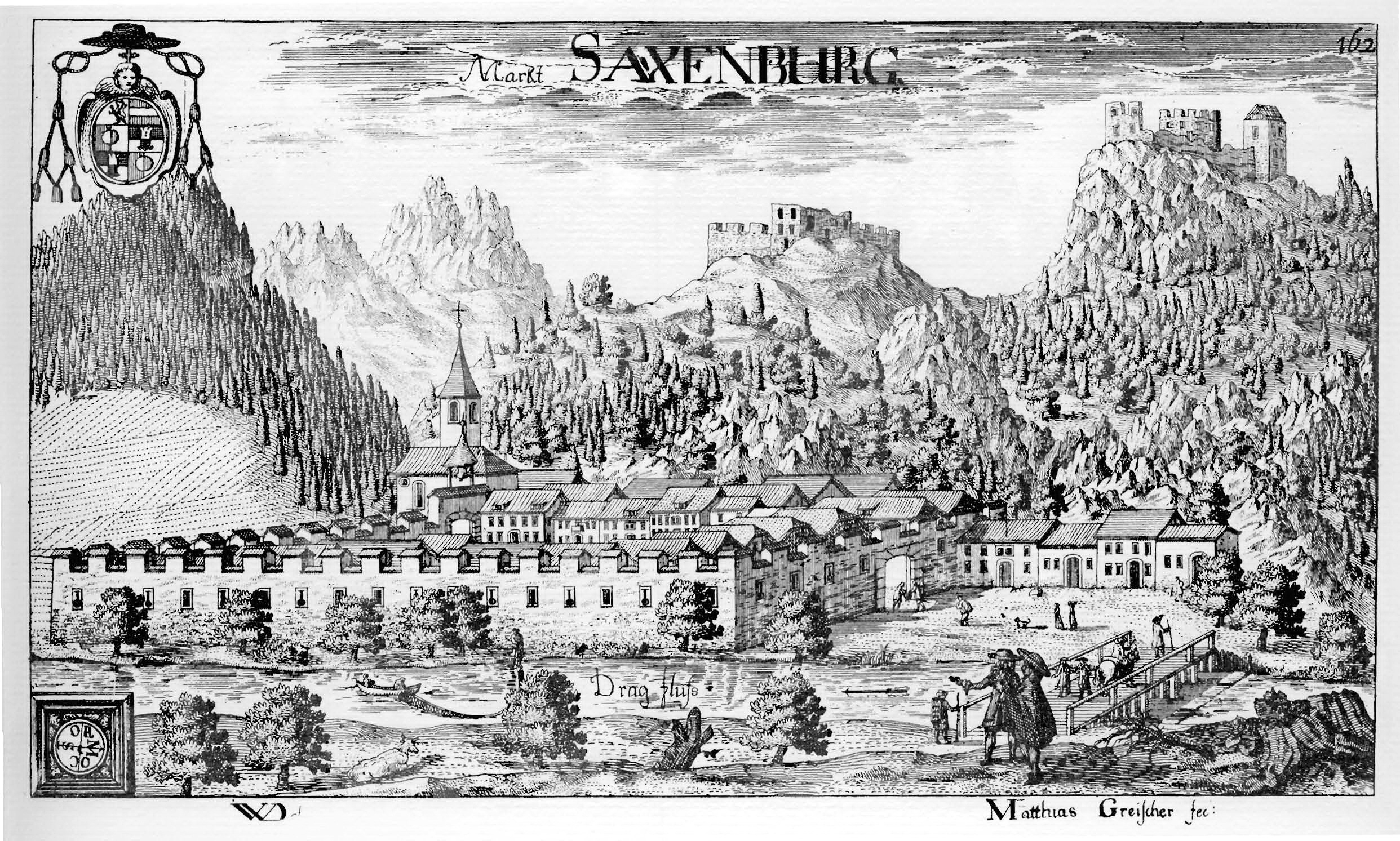
Valvasor's print of Sachsenburg in 1680

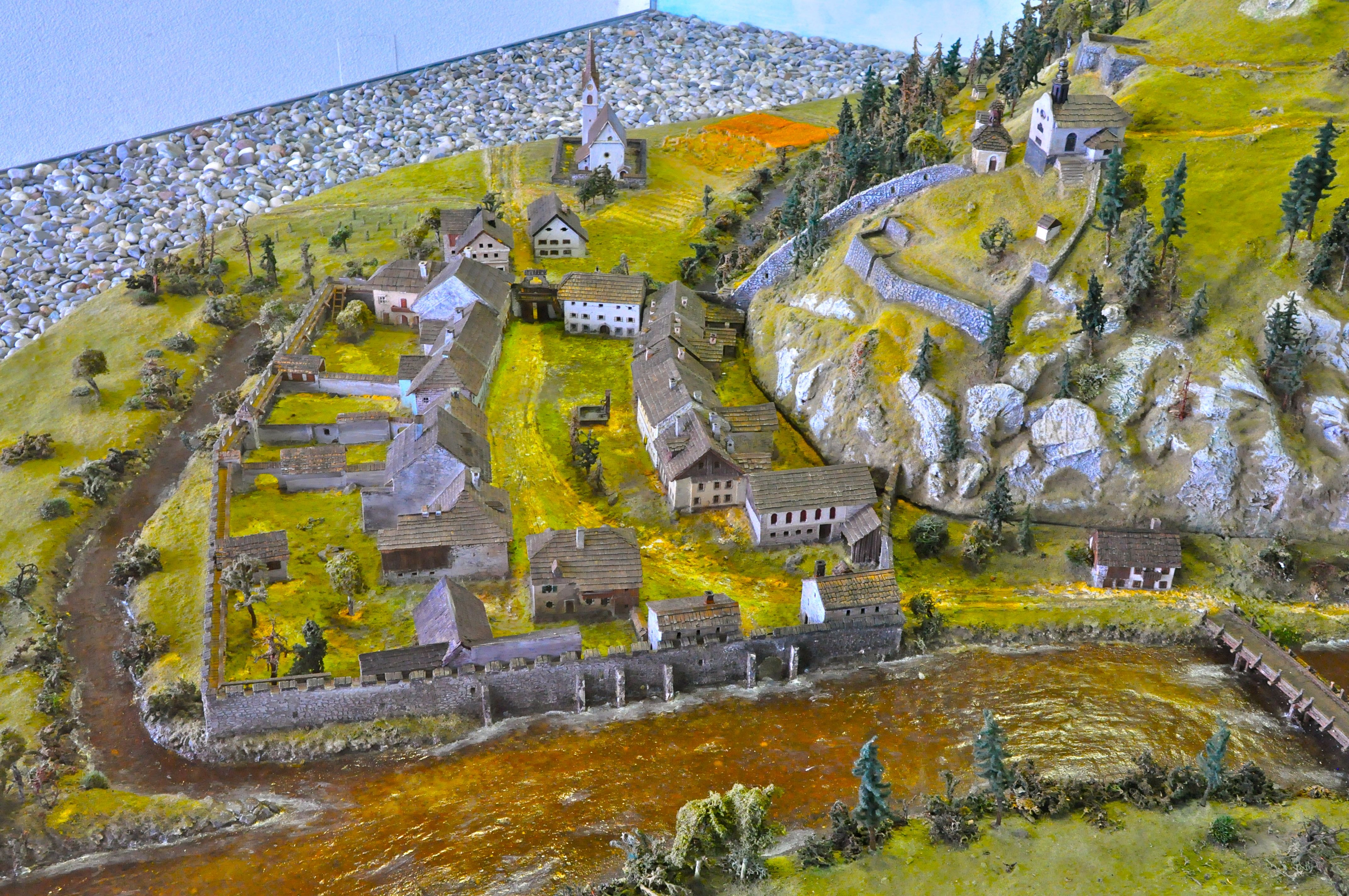
Model of Sachsenburg in 1730

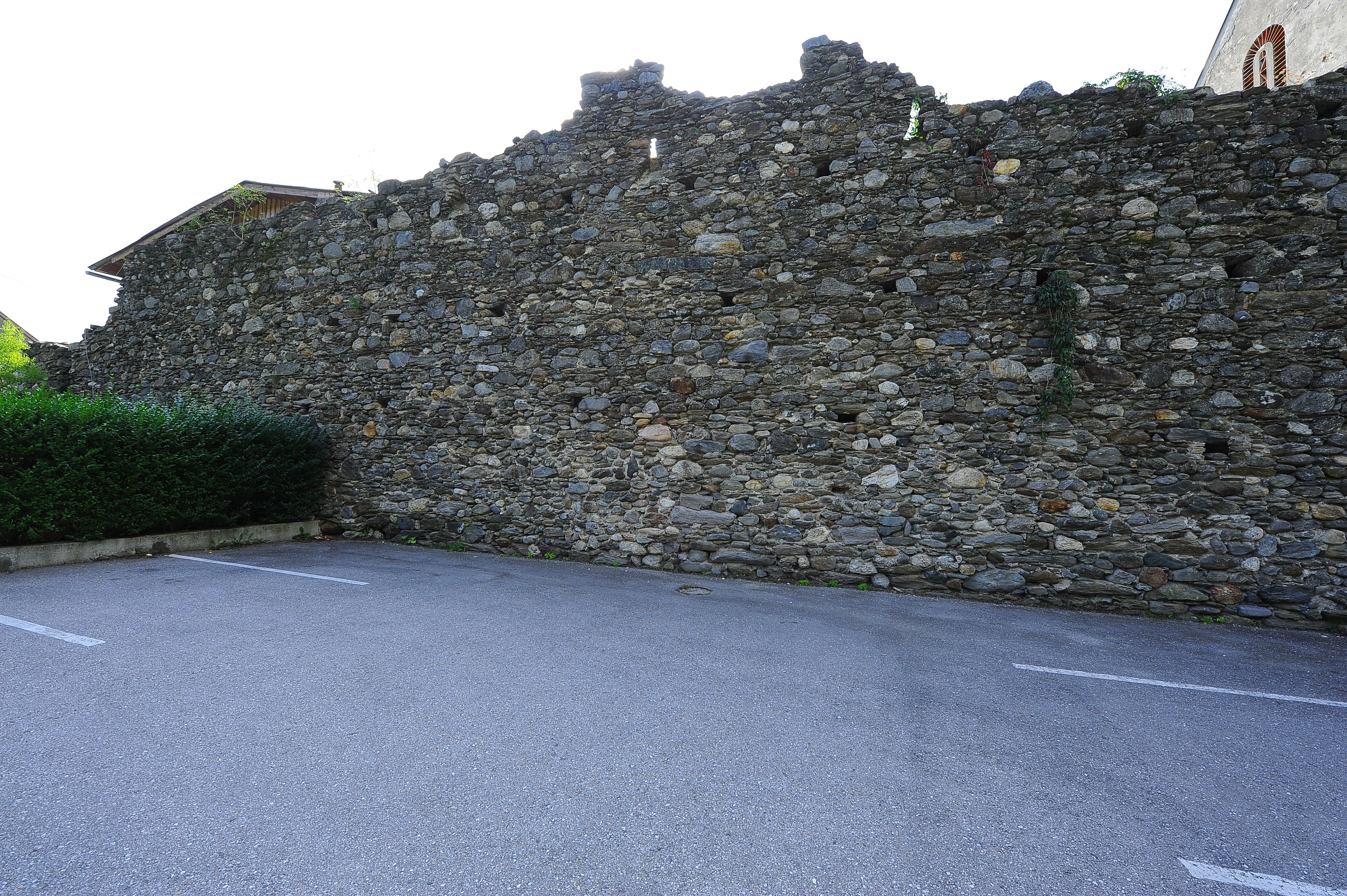
Sachsenburg walls

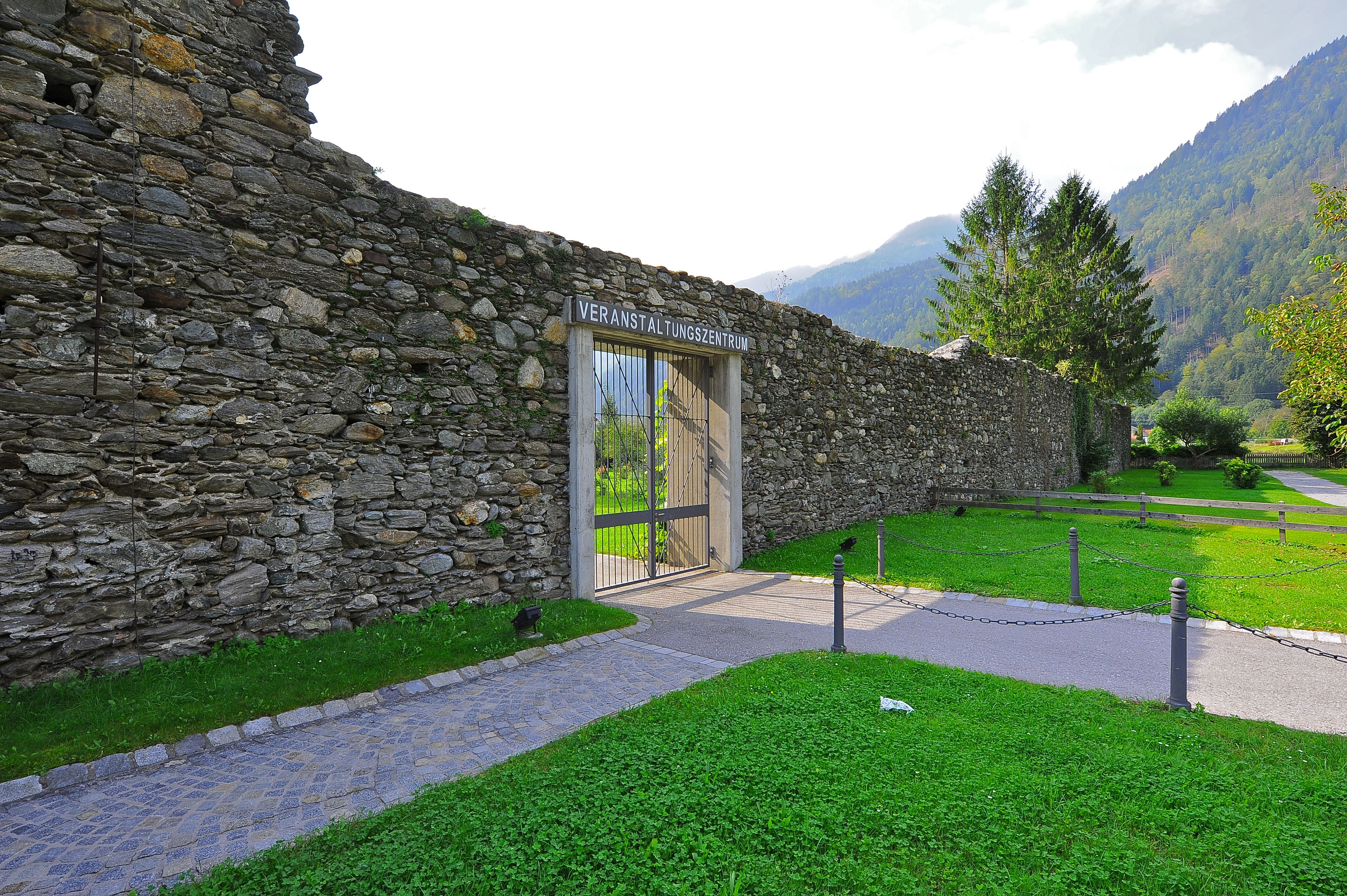
Sachsenburg walls

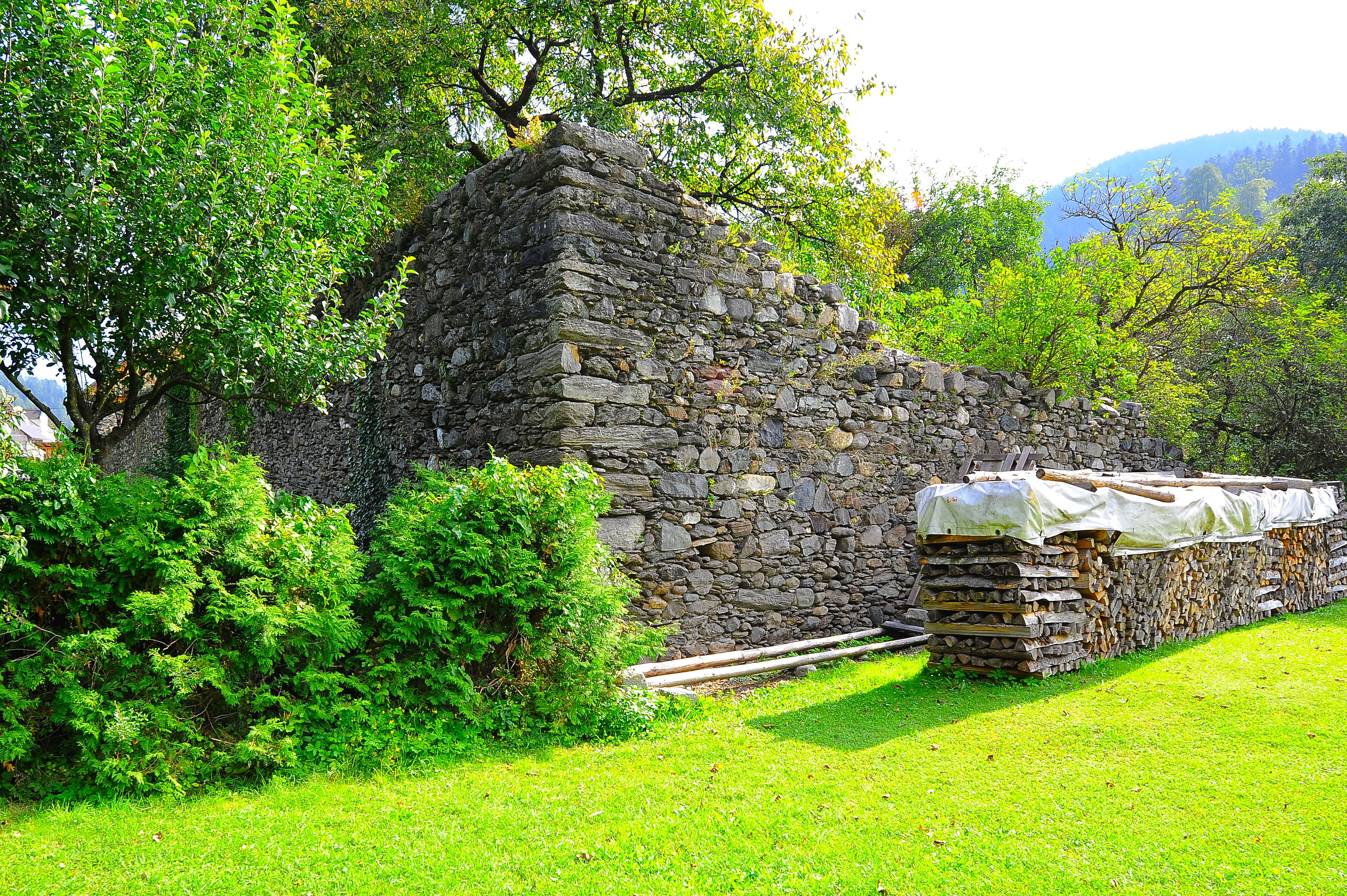
Sachsenburg corner of the walls

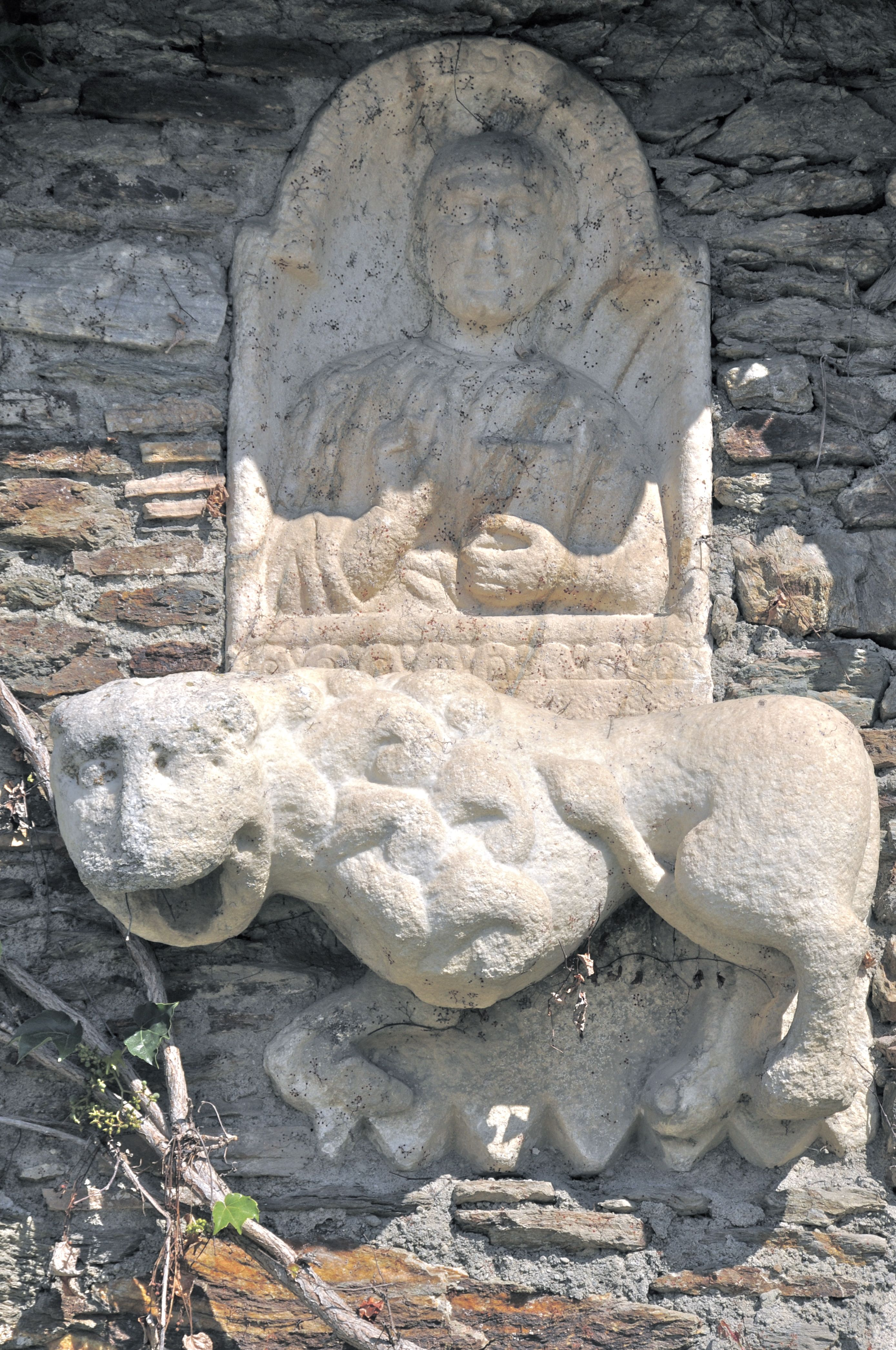
Strassburg Stone relief on the city wall with the portrait of bishop Walther von Vatz 1200–1213

- Straßburg. The walled town was placed between the castle of the Prince-Bishops of Gurk in the north and the river Gurk in the S. Strassburg was first mentioned in 864, when Louis the German gave it to the Archdiocese of Salzburg. The castle was erected in 1147 under the fourth bishop of Gurk Roman I, and town was given market rights in 1229. Some walls remain together with a small round corner tower. The gateway to the southeast has been removed.
- Villach. Apart from a few fragments of wall, tower and evidence for a moat at the northwest corner of the defensive circuit, none of the walls or gates now survive. Merian’s plan of the town in 1649 and the prospect view of 1679 show extensive fortifications. There were six gate towers and a defended bridgehead across the river Drau. The bridgehead was walled with a further gate-tower and a bastion in front. The river Drau curves round Villach, and on the river frontage there was a single wall, but on the western and southern sides there was a secondary wall with a series round towers. In front of this secondary wall there was a wide moat fed by the Drau.
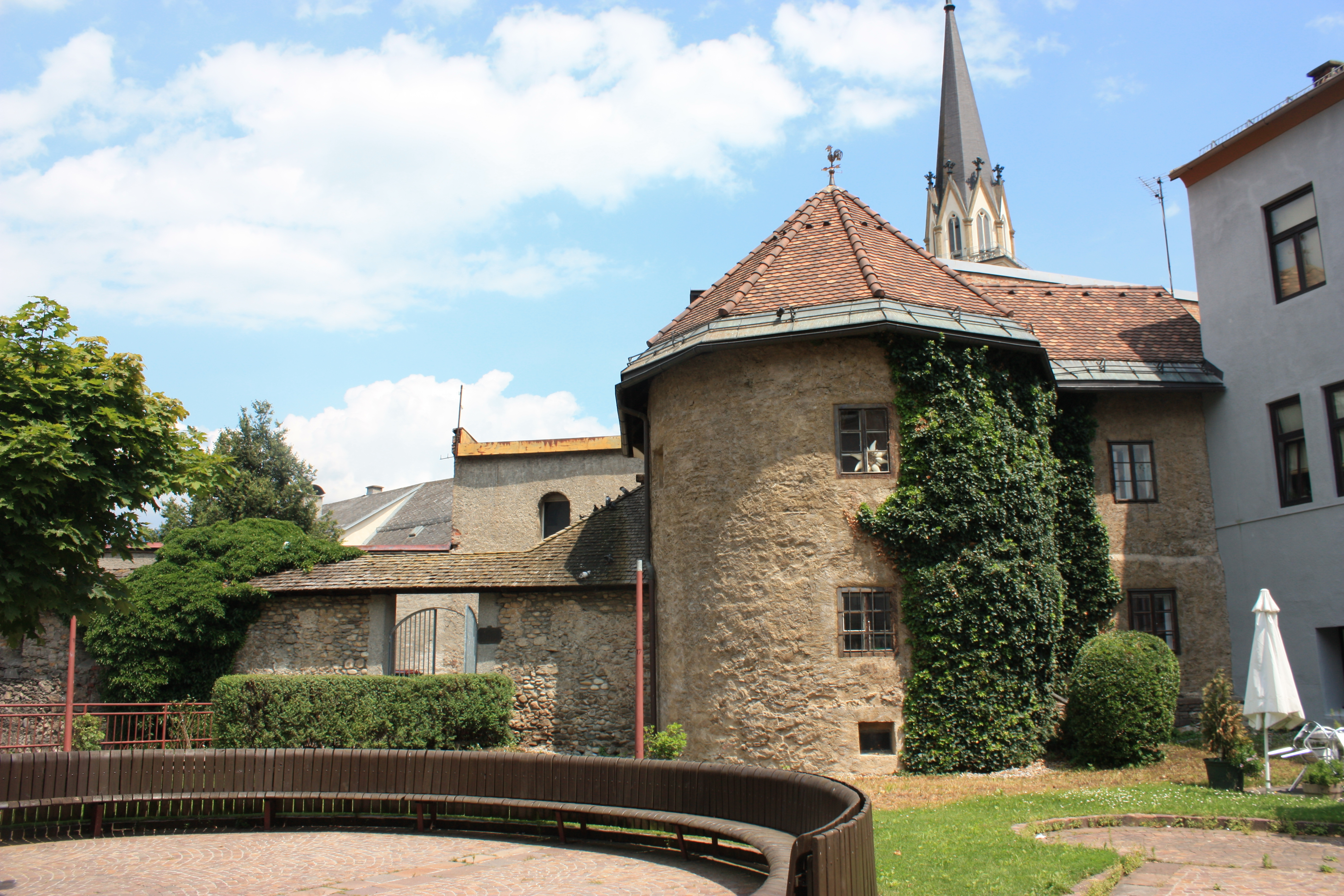
Villach - Reste der Stadtmauer und Wehrturm

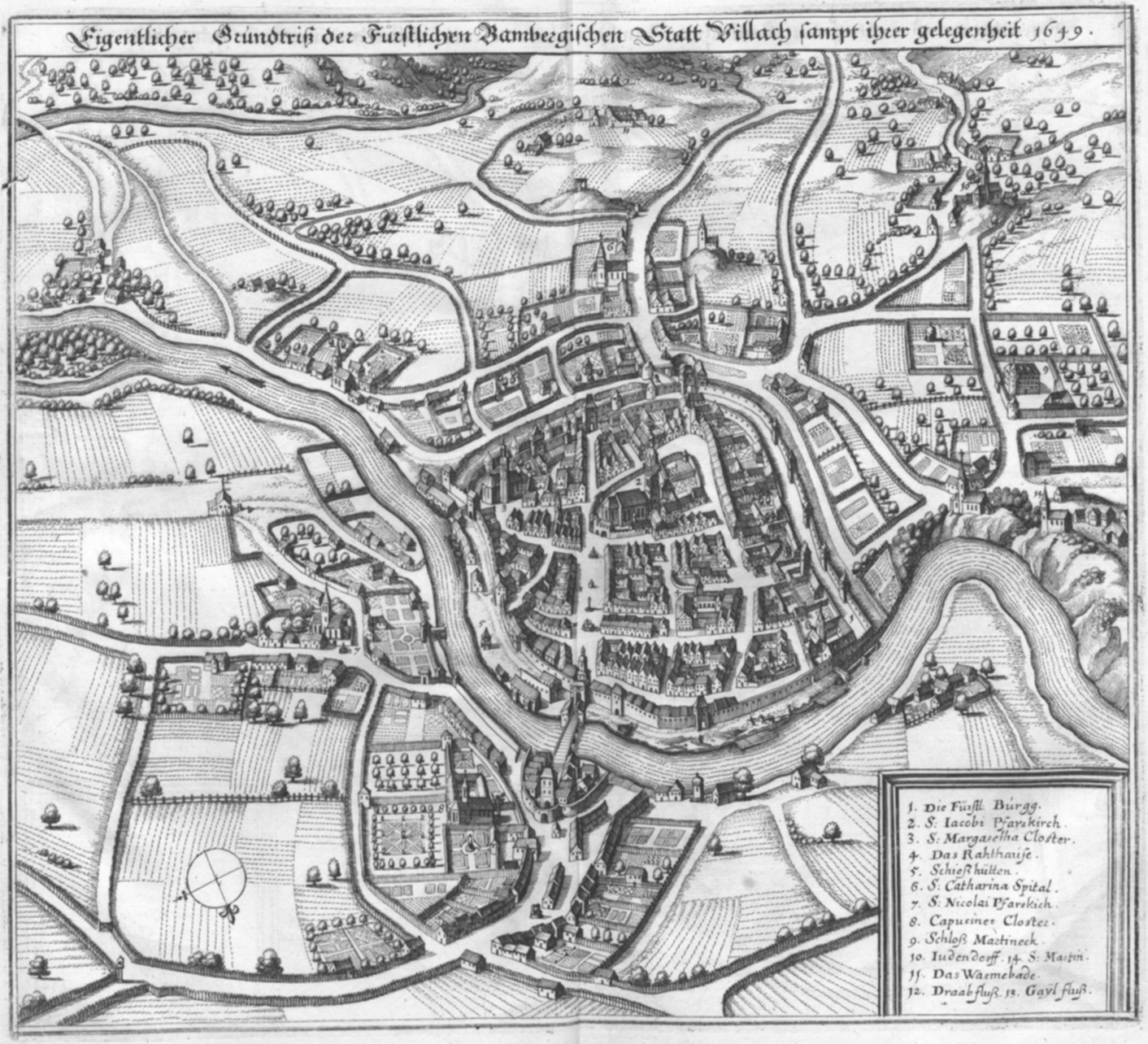
Merian's prospect view of Villach in 1679

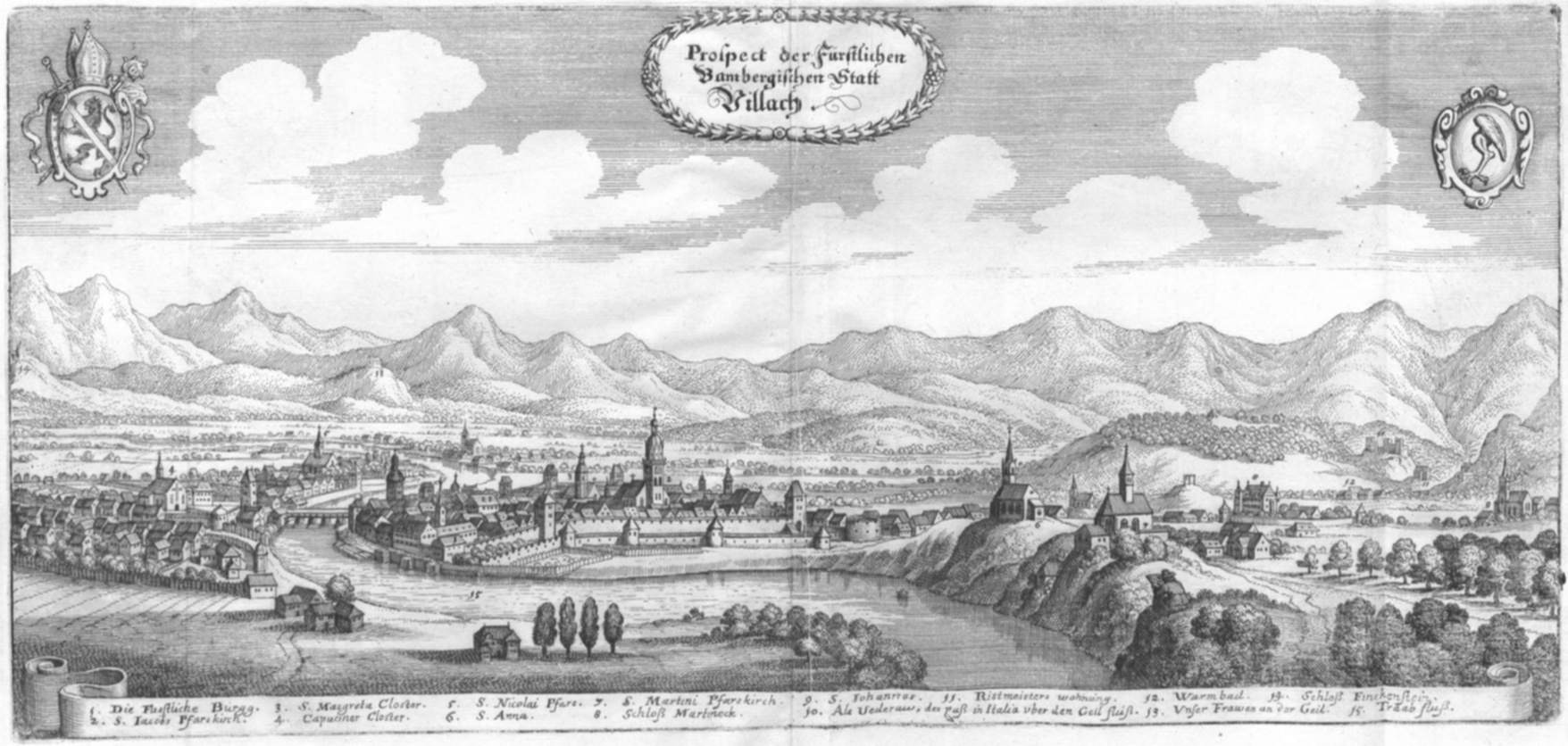
Statt Villach in prospect (Merian)
- Völkermarkt is sited on a cliff overlooking the river Drau. In 1090 Volko of Rheinfranken laid out a trading town for Ulrich II, Duke of Carinthia. Then in 1217 a bridge was built over the Drau. Today there is virtually no evidence for the fortifications apart from fragments of wall and a tower on the southeast edge of the cliff. However two Merian prints show that the town was fully walled with gate towers on the east and W. On the flatter land to the north the wall was angled and there was a prominent round tower. On the craggy promontory to the south there was another gate tower with a road leading to the Drau bridge. The town had a large rectangular marketplace that has been encroached upon by buildings.
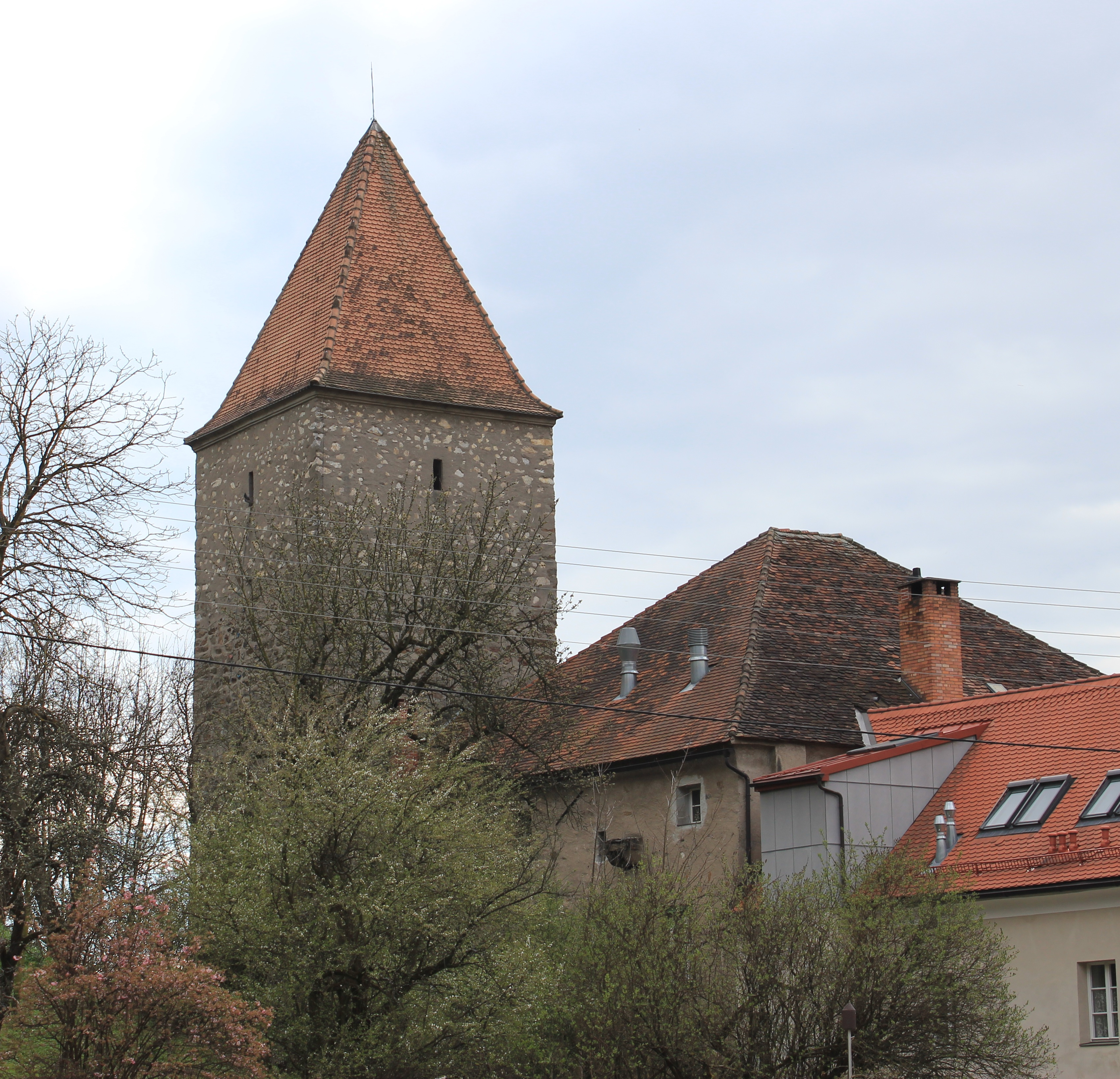
  Wolfsberg Matertum
- Wolfsberg. The walled town occupied both sides of the river Lavant in the Lavantal. The castle, mentioned in 1178 as ‘Wolfsperch’, was on an outcrop with walls stretching down to the river. On the west was the main portion of the town joined with a bridge over the Lavant. The town was the centre of the Archbishop of Bamberg’s estates in Carinthia and received a charter in 1331. The Merian print of 1679 shows the western part of the town with a north gate with a defensive bastion in front of it. It also shows a west gate and wall with round and square towers set into it, which was fronted by a wide water-filled ditch. Only one square tower, the Marterturm survives.

=== Lower Austria (Niederösterreich) ===
- Allentsteig. Situated at the headwater of the Thaya. The walled area is approximately rectangular. The walls and two gatetowers were removed in the early years of the 19th century. The wall lay to the south of Dr Ernst Krenn Strasse and the east of the Spittalgasse. Ashort length of wall survives to the southwest of the castle. The castle, which lies in the north of the area, is mentioned as a Kuenringer family possession in 1132. At the same time the parish church is mentioned, which was a daughter church of Altpölla. A large and important coin hoard of c. 1170 was deposited in this area. A spindle-shaped marketplace on an east–west axis (Hauptstrasse) was laid out to the south of the castle and there was a ‘stadtor’ (gatetower) at each end of the market. This layout presumably occurred around 1276 when Allentsteig was granted marchrect. The shape of the market appears to have been altered by the ‘Statberg’, which presumably provided a second market area to the northeast. In 1380 Allentsteig passed to the Herren von Kamegg-Kaya and is now mentioned as a ‘Stadt’.
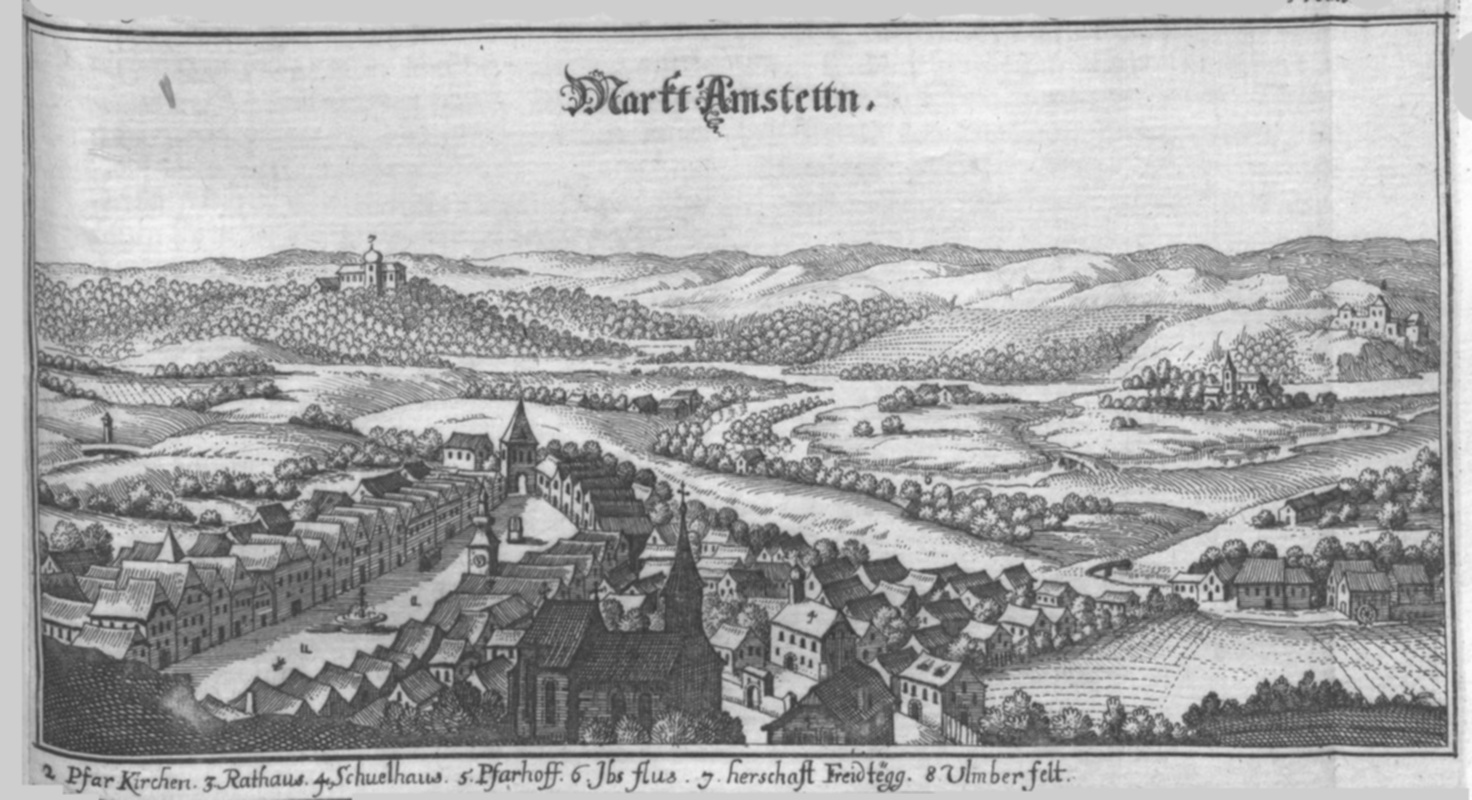
  Amstetten. Illustrated by Merian
- Amstetten. Not walled but ditched and banked. Granted a market in 1276. Merian shows a gate tower on the Linzer Strasse and vertical images show that a ditch survives to the north while the 'Graben' to the south should represent the line of the ditch. Spindle-shaped marketplace running eastwards from the gate-tower, which presumably terminated at another gate-tower.

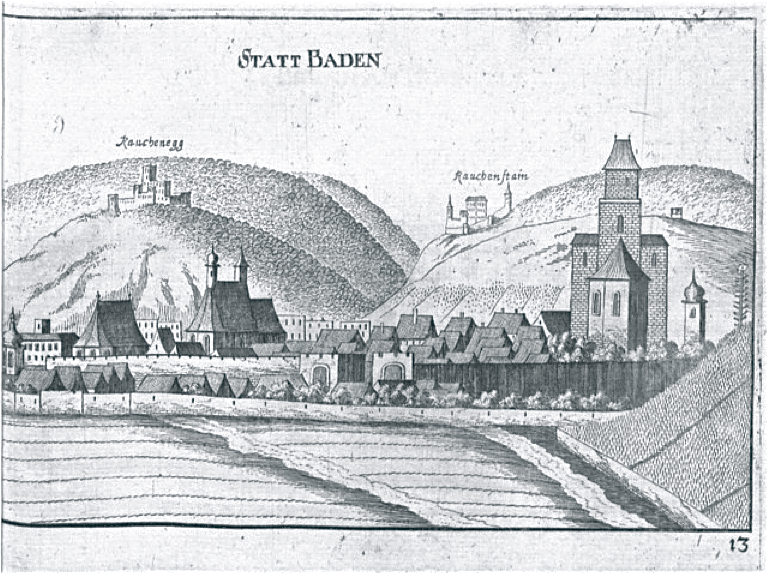
Baden Lower Austria Georg Mätthaus Vischer 1672

- Baden. First mentioned in 869 in connection with Charlemagne and again in 1125. Granted a charter (Stadtrecht) in 1480. No evidence of a wall today, but clearly shown in Vischer's print of 1672.
- Bruck an der Leitha. On the old border with Hungary. First mentioned in 1074, charter 1239. Vischer’s print of 1672 shows a town with a double wall system and a wide moat with gate-towers. The Schloss Prugg Castle occupies the northeast corner of the walled circuit and had its own water filled moat. Vischer shows three massive round corner bastions on the east and south sides, which have disappeared. The walls are some of the best preserved in Austria and there are two surviving towers, the Ungarn Turm and the Wien Turm. The moat and secondary wall can be seen in places and the secondary wall has a round tower at its termination in the castle park. Grid street plan with large rectangular marketplace.
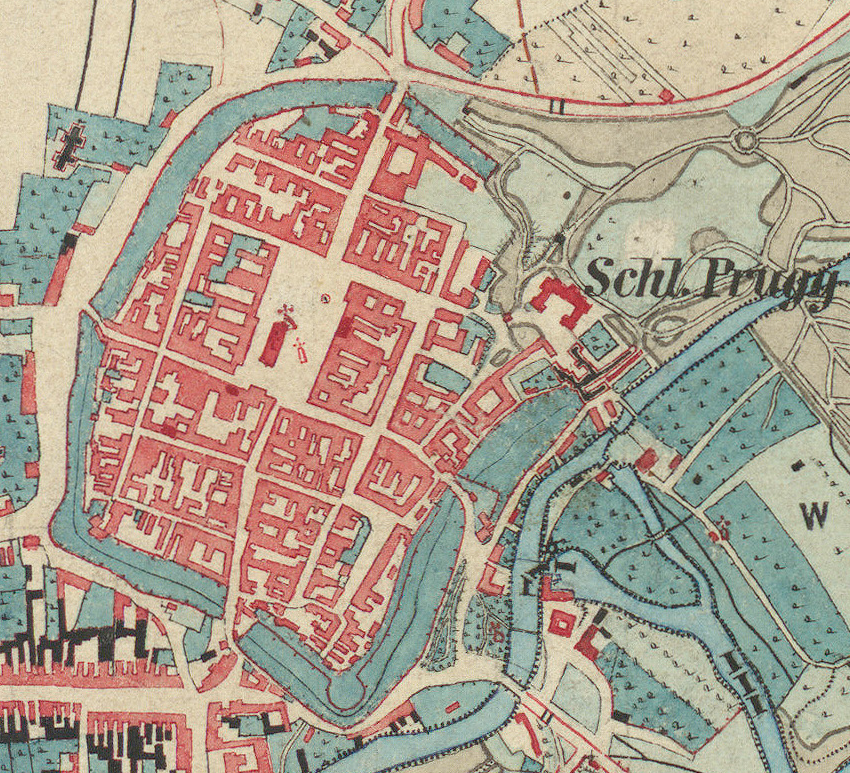
Franziszeische Landesaufnahme . Map of Bruck c. 1830

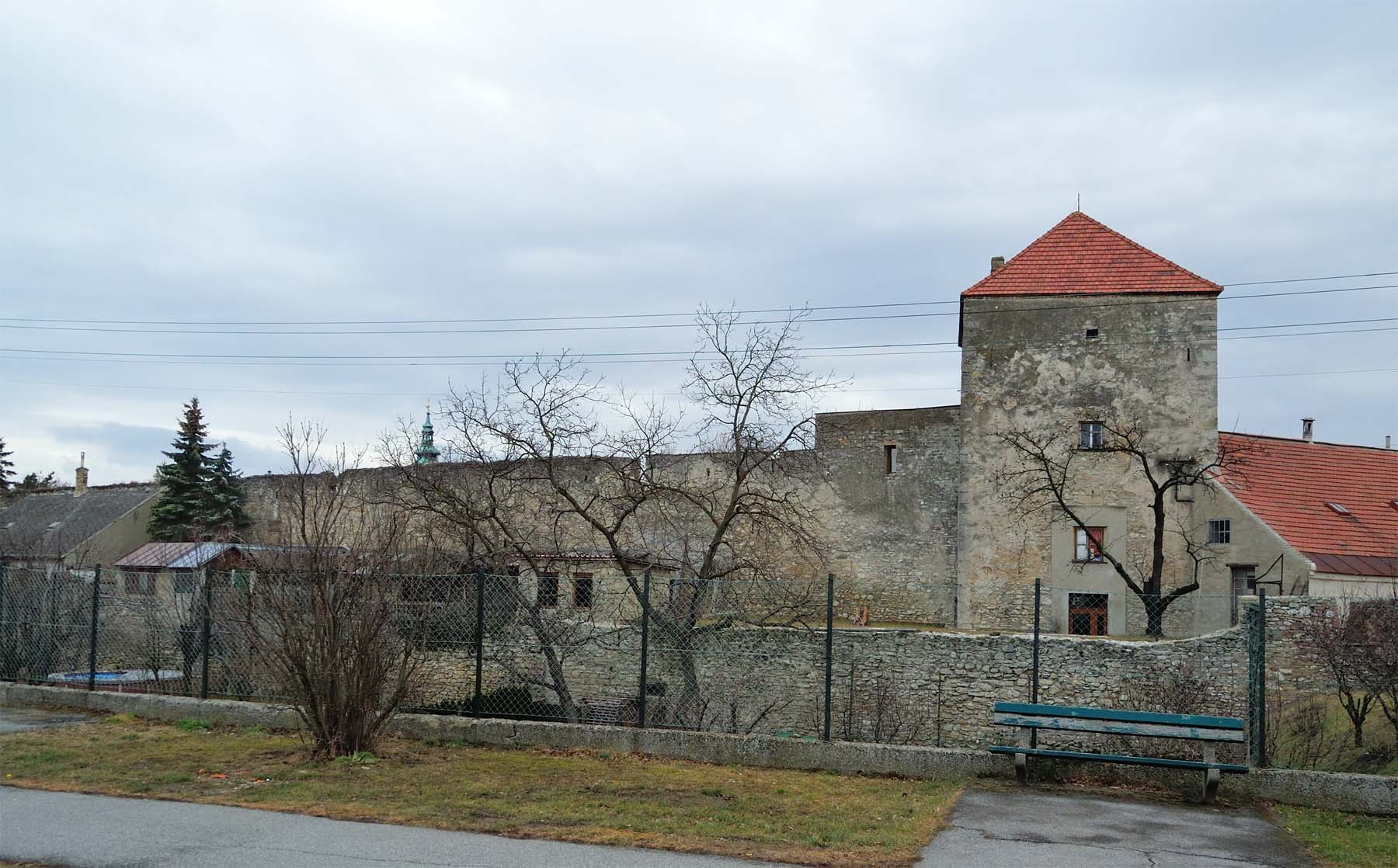
Town wall and rectangular corner tower, Bruck an der Leitha

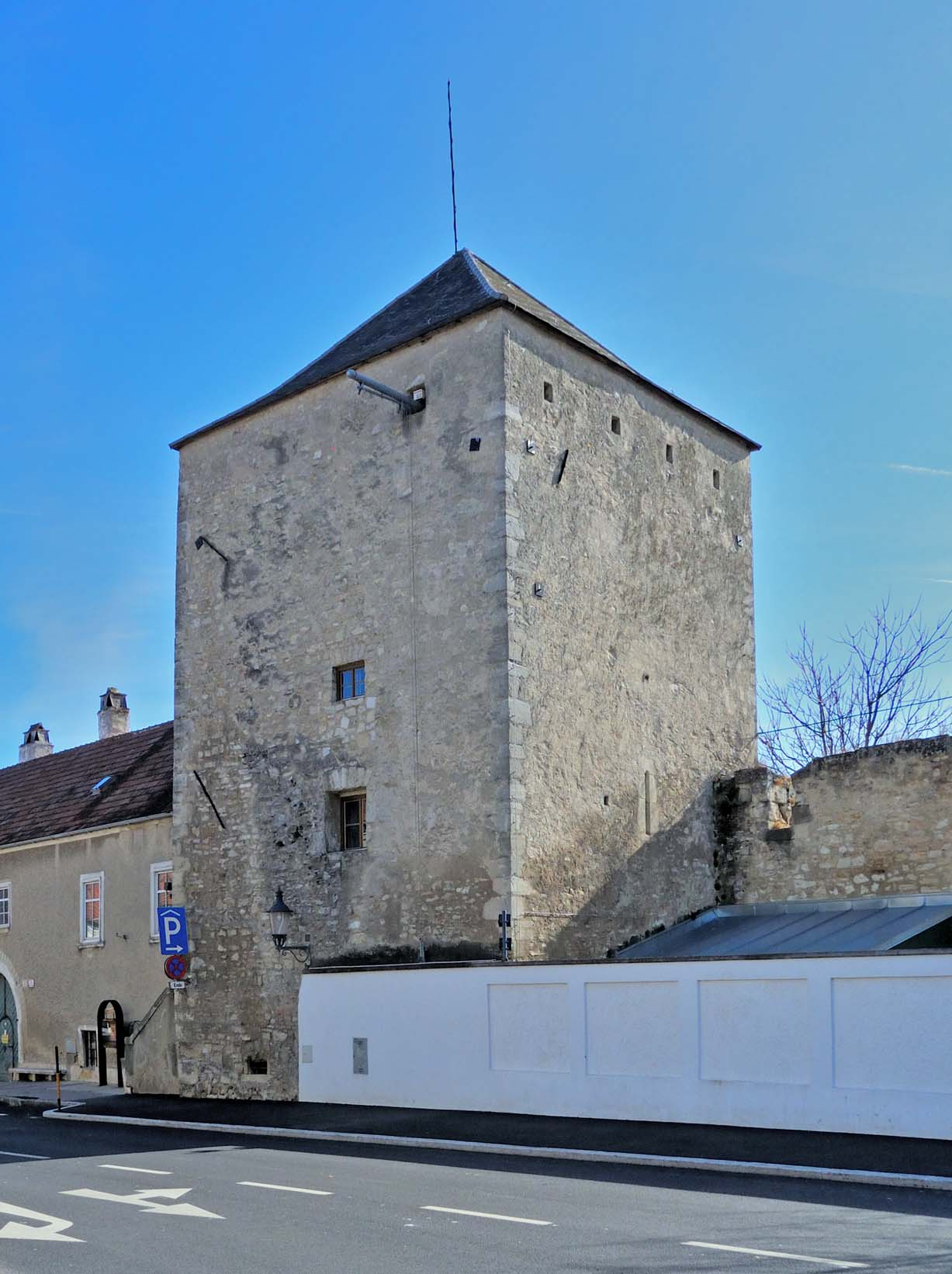
Wiener Turm, Bruck an der Leitha
- Drosendorf. Charter 1240. One of the best preserved and researched of the Austrian walled towns.
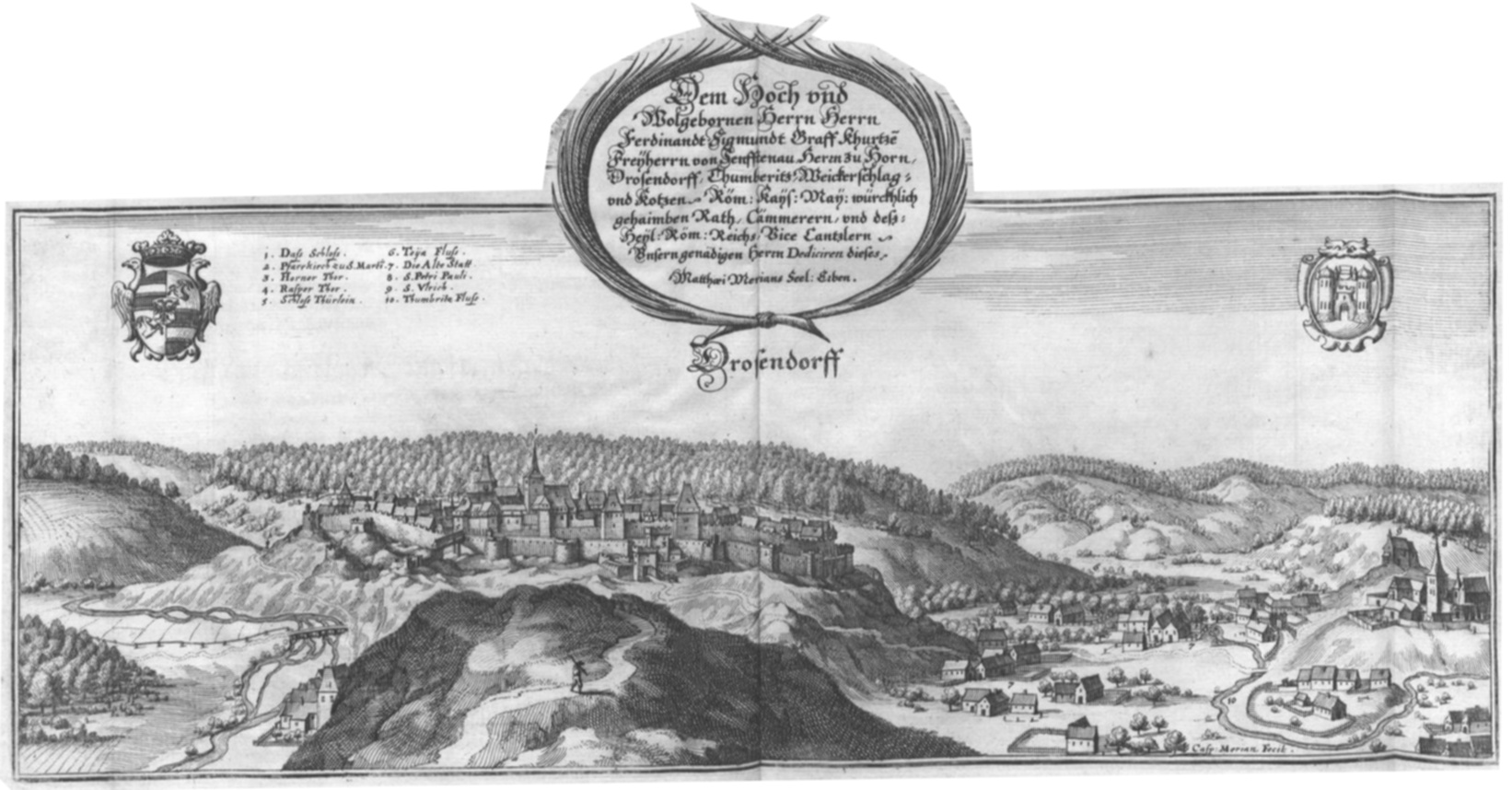
Drosendorf (Merian)

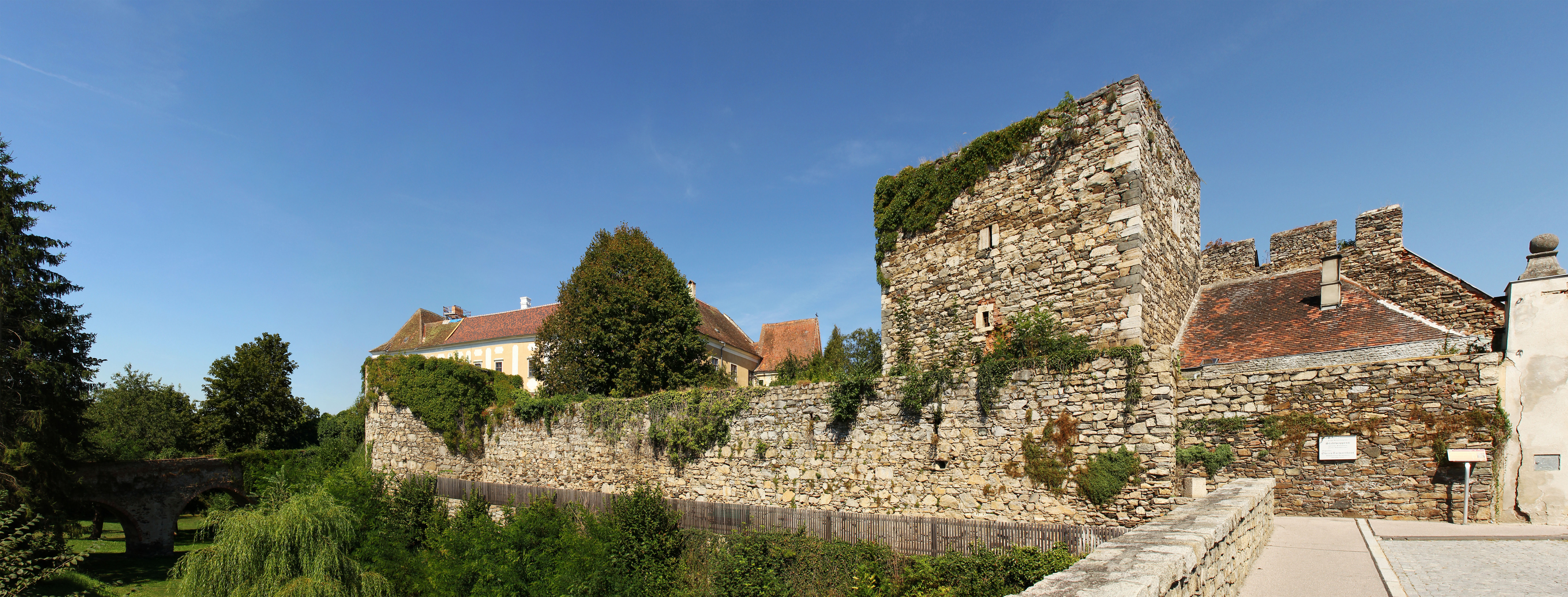
Stadtmauer Drosendorf Südseite

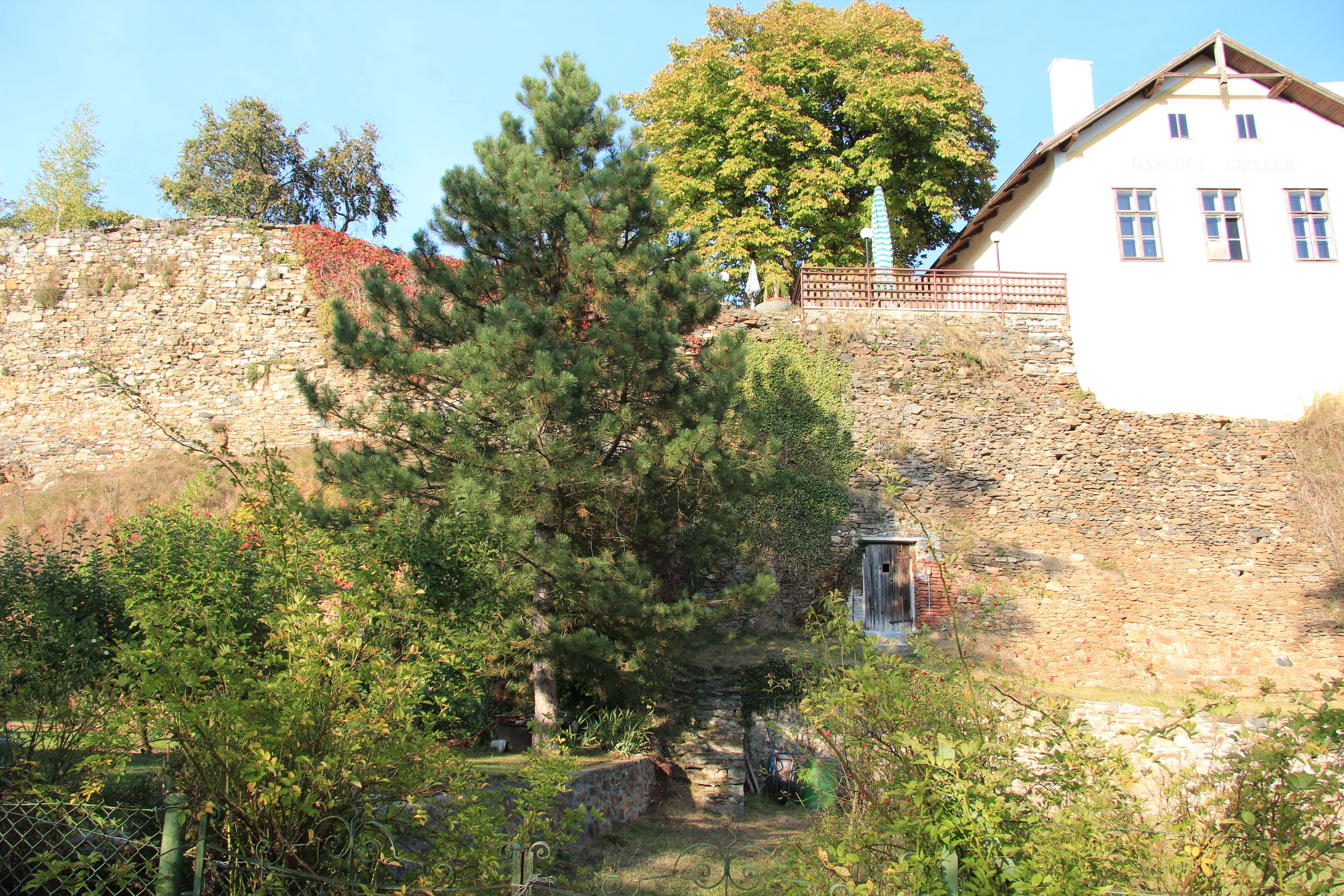
Stadtmauer Drosendorf 0843

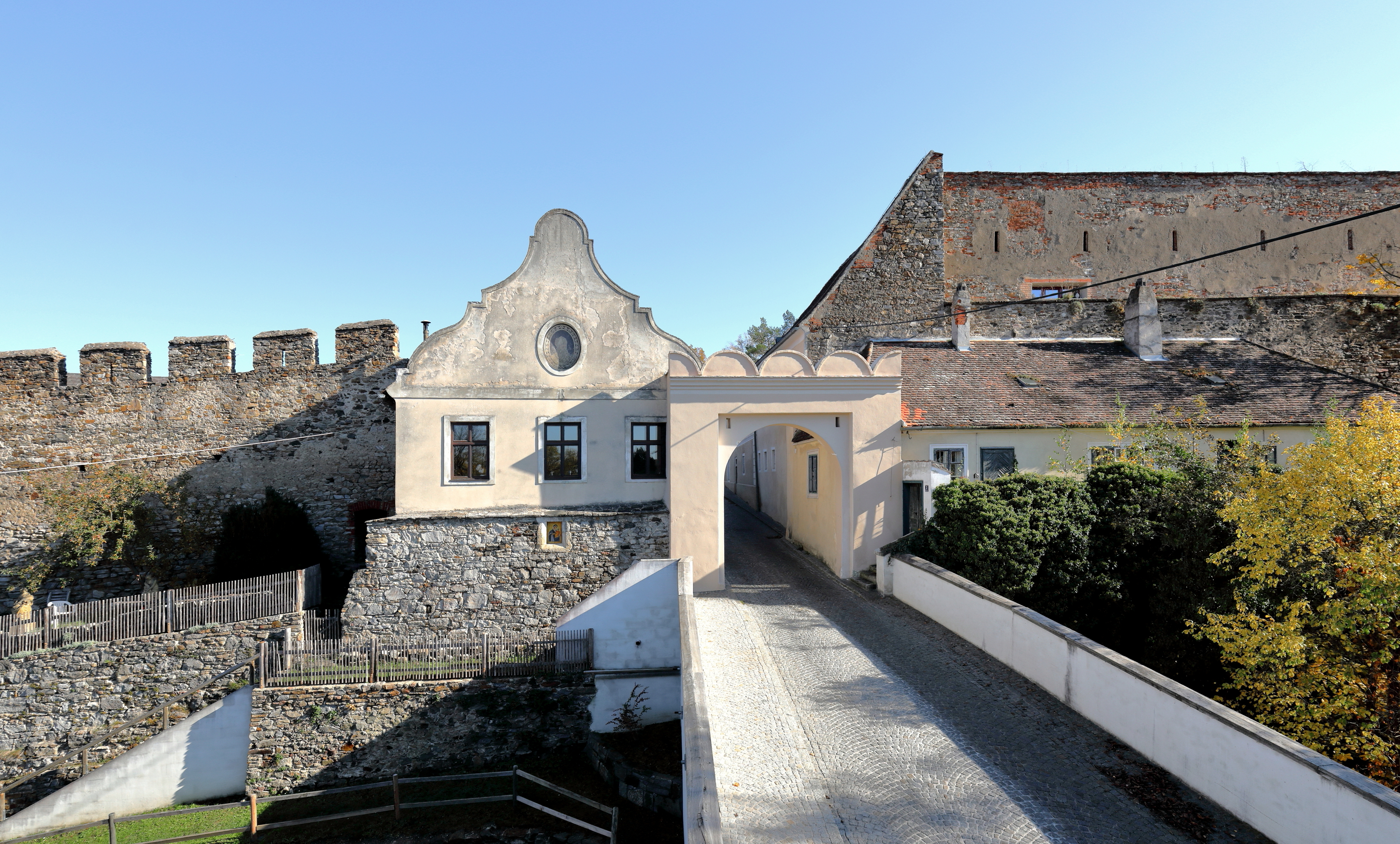
Drosendorf (Raabser Tor)

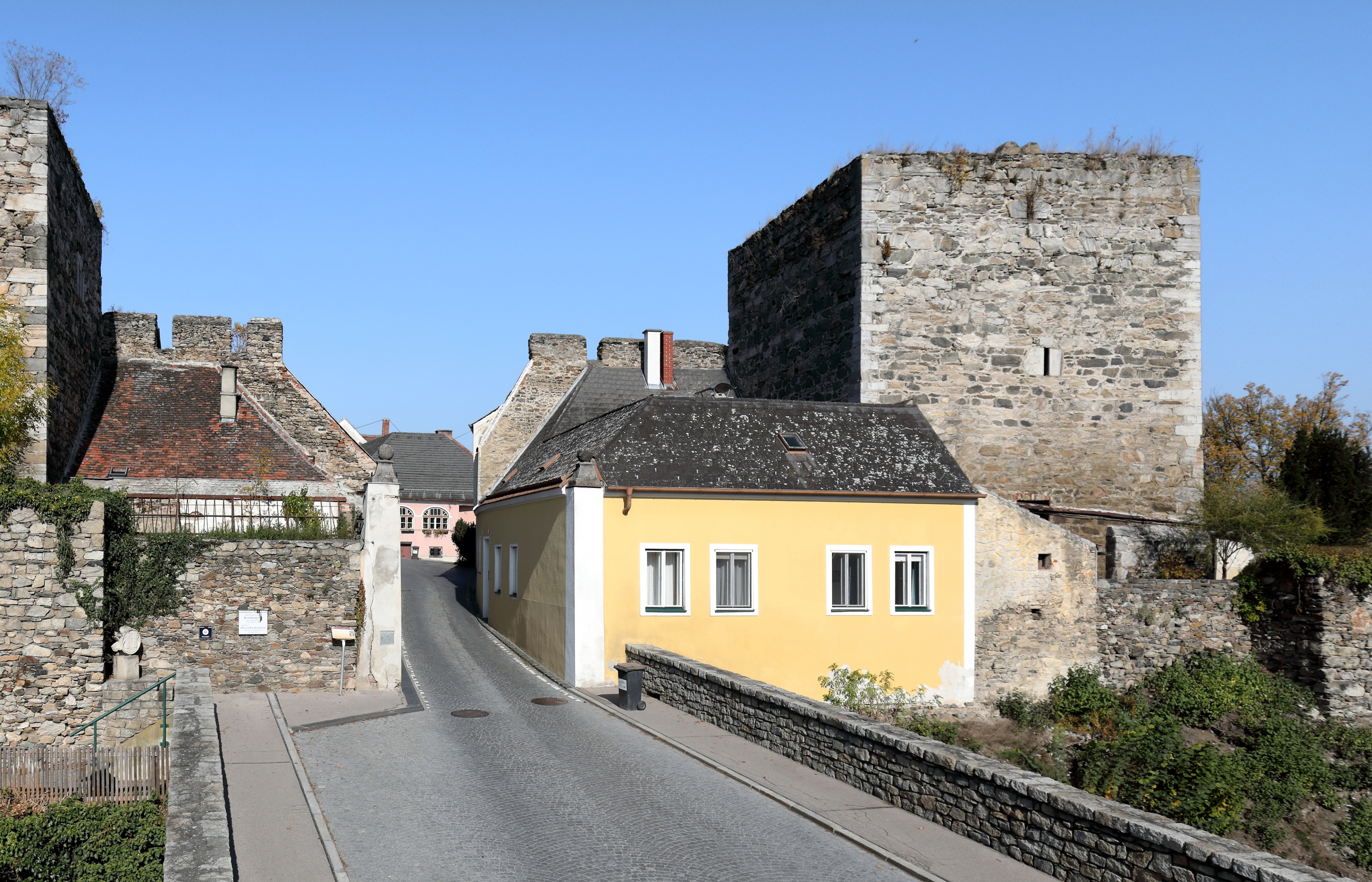
Drosendorf (Horner Tor)

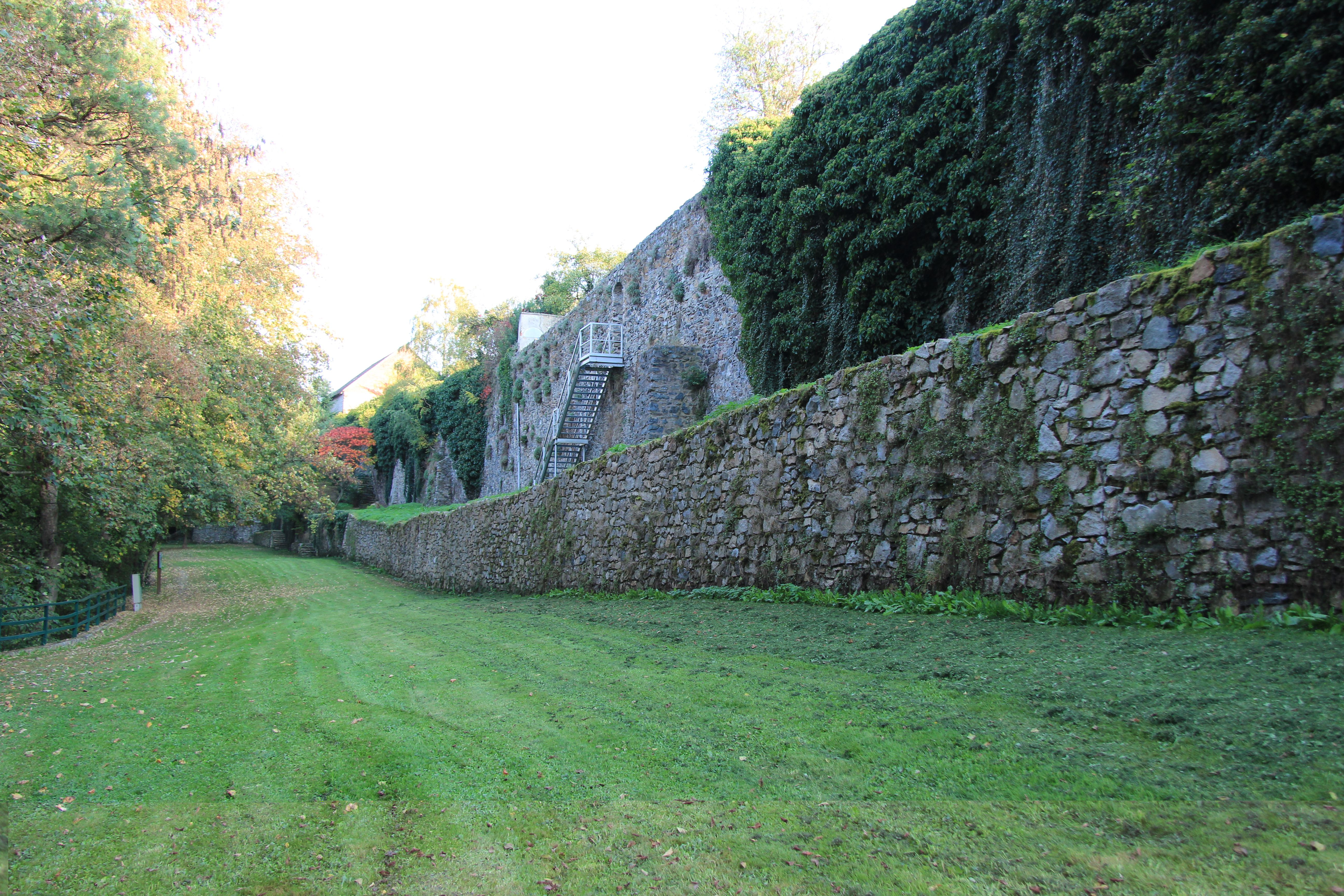
Stadtmauer Drosendorf 0861

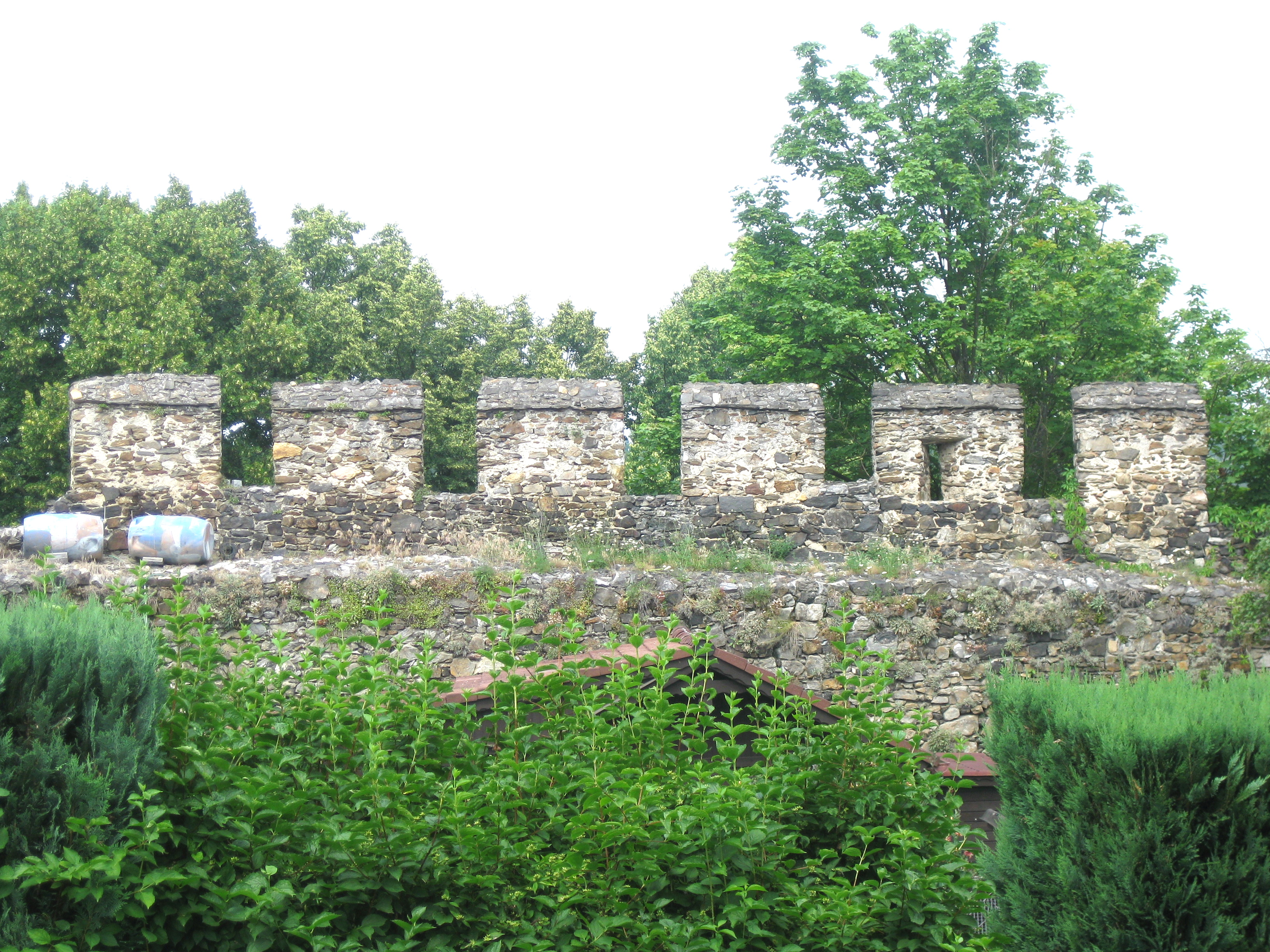
Drosendorf Wall crenellations and walkway
- Dürnstein
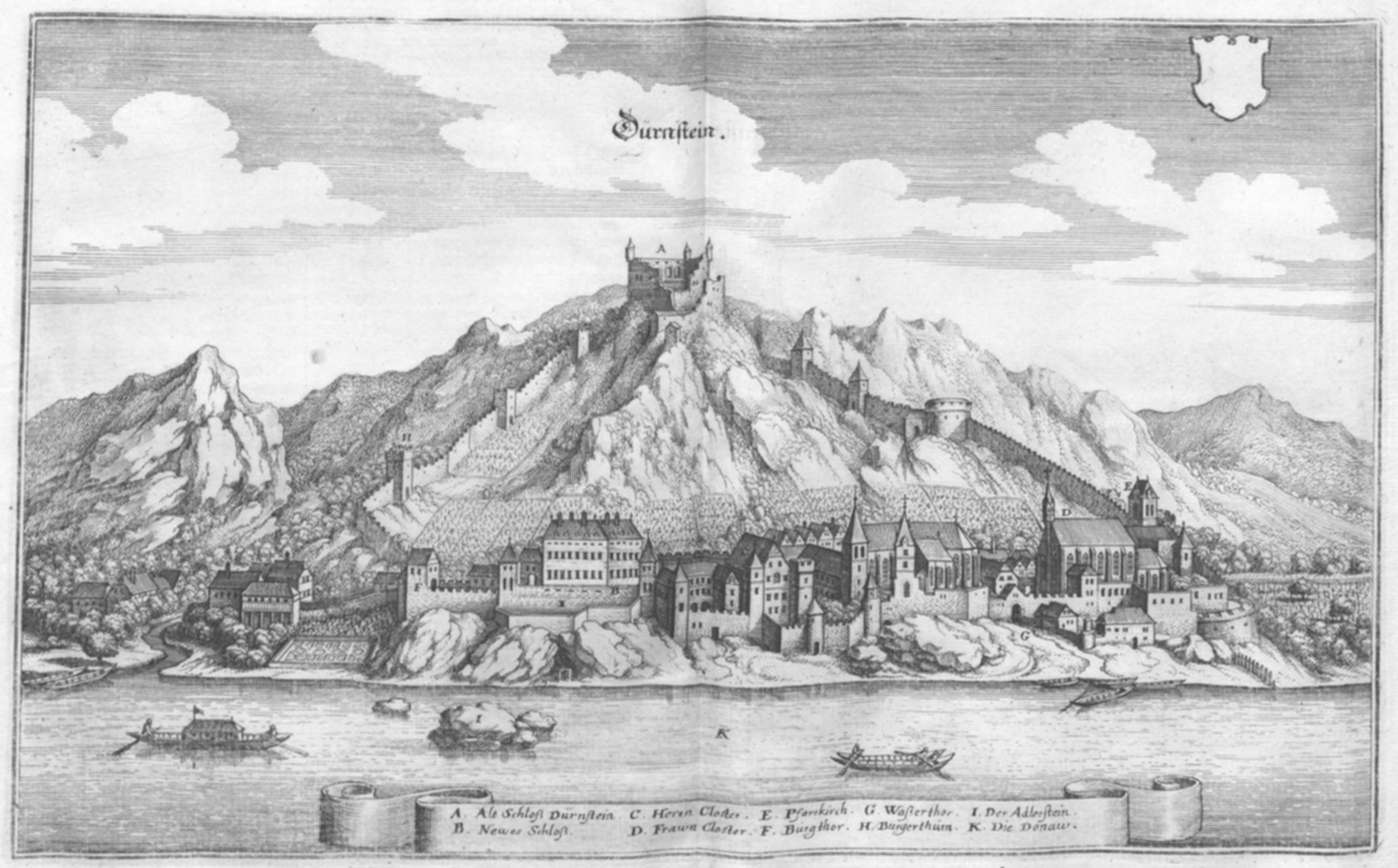
Statt Dürnstein (Merian)

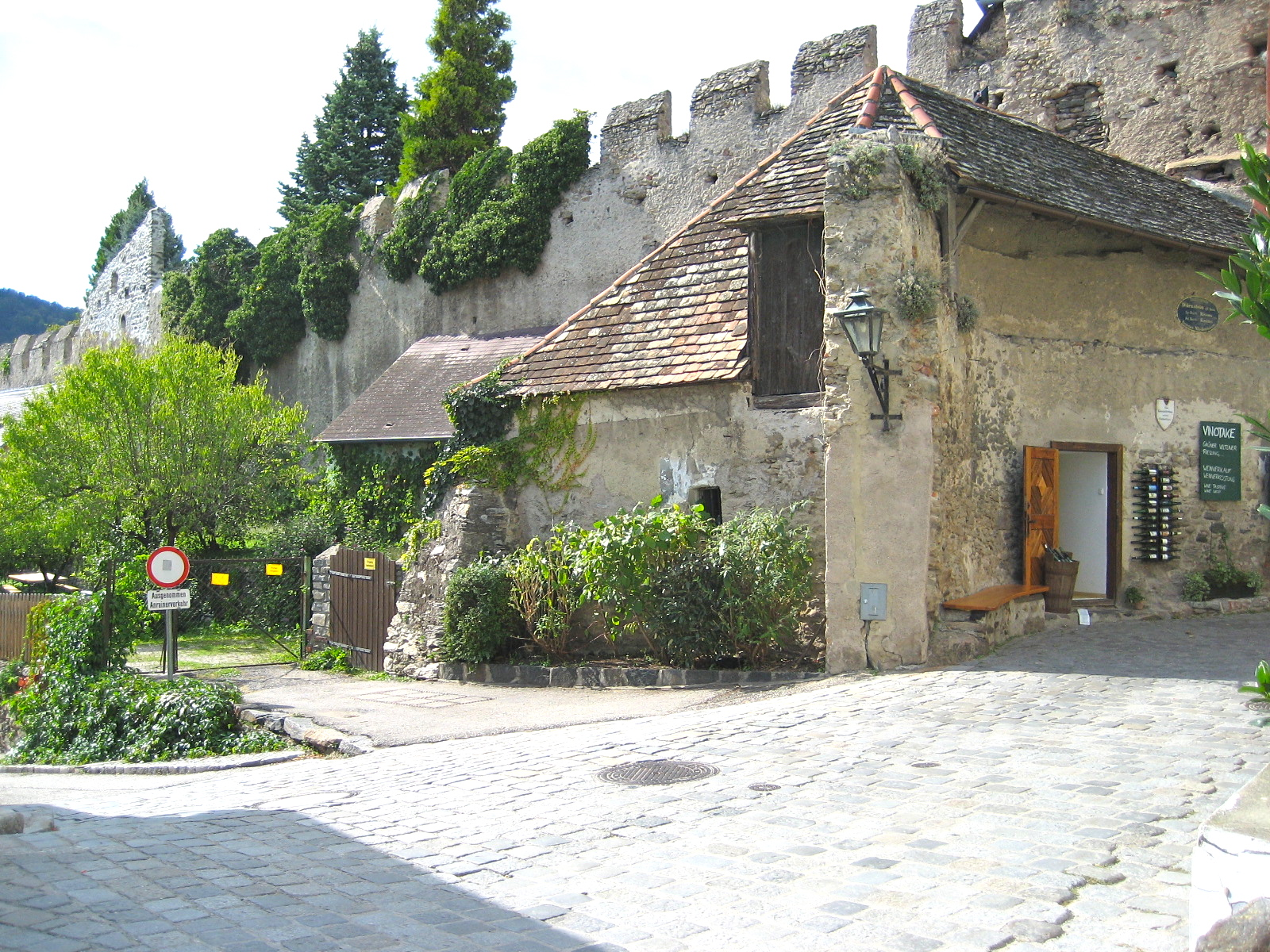
Town wall in Dürnstein

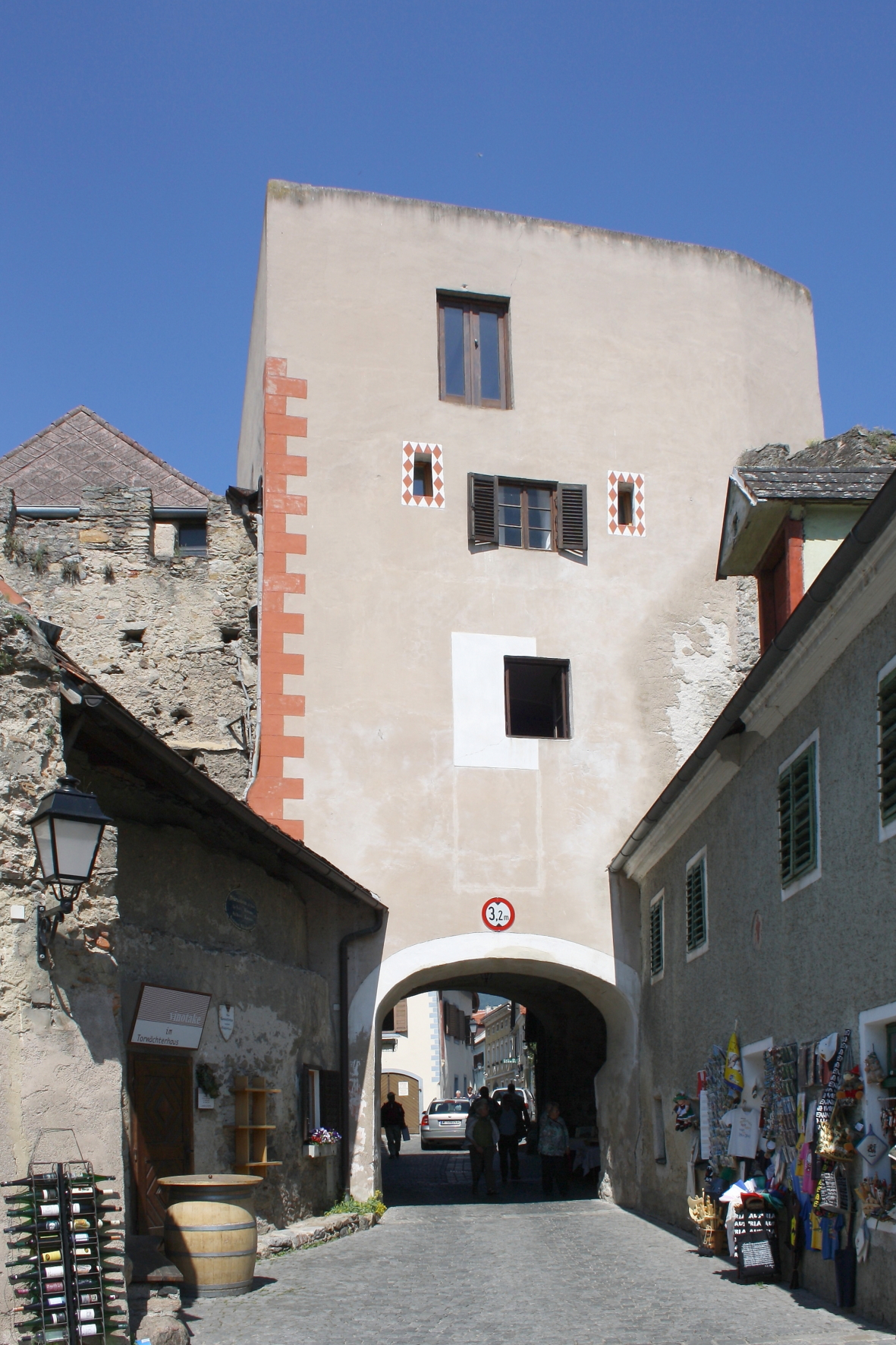
Dürnstein - Kremser Tor

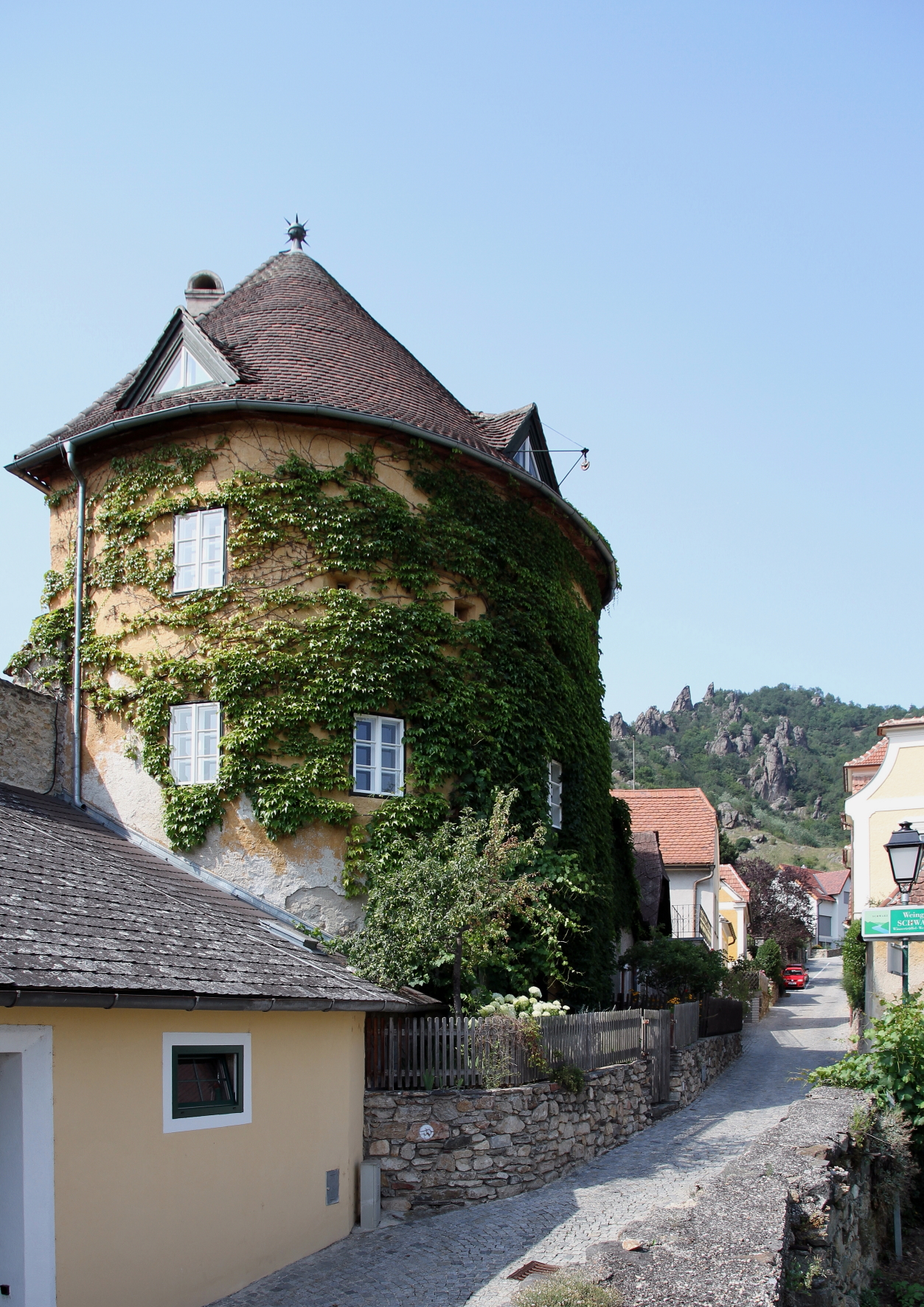
Dürnstein 67 - Bastion
- Ebenfurth. On the former boundary of Austria with Hungary. Granted a charter in 1515. Today, apart from the Castle, there appears to be no trace of defensive walls. The Merian (1649/1679) and Vischer (1672) prints show the town was well fortified. Both artists show the town from the southeast looking across the river Leitha, but Merian shows the walls in a ruinous state and a gate tower with a bastion in front, while the Vischer shows the gate tower blocked, without the bastion and a large round tower has appeared to the south of the gate-tower. It is possible that these changes were made to counter the Turkish threat. The gate tower may be the same as the Stattor that was still standing in the 1850s. Vertical GIS images and present day property boundaries show that the Ebenfurth defences were roughly five-sided, joining onto the castle at the south.
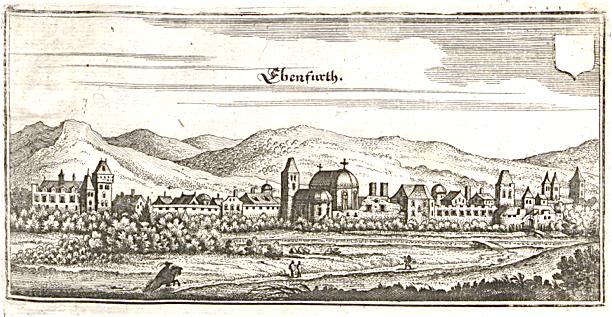
Matthäus Merian Ebenfurth 1679

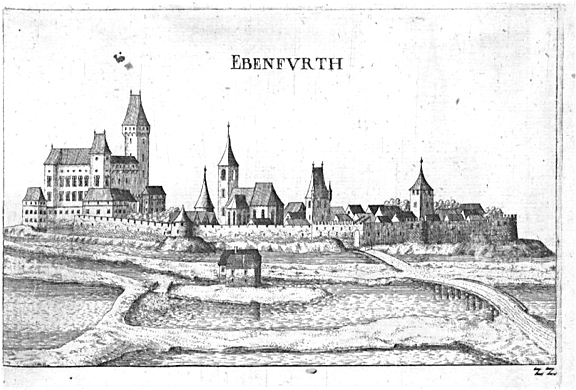
Ebenfurth, Lower Austria by Georg Mätthaus Vischer 1672

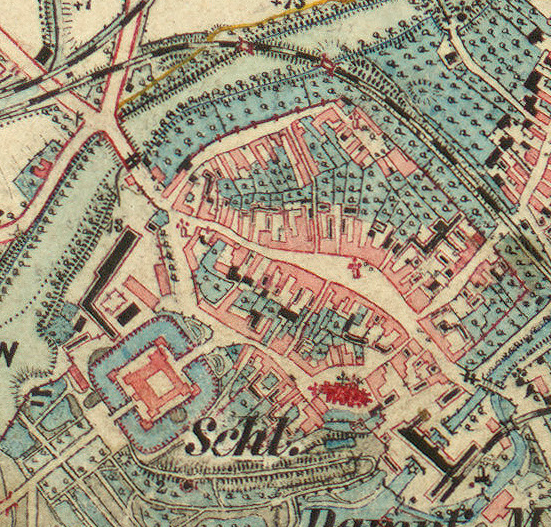
Ebenfurth. Franziszeische Landesaufnahme 2nd Military Survey c. 1835

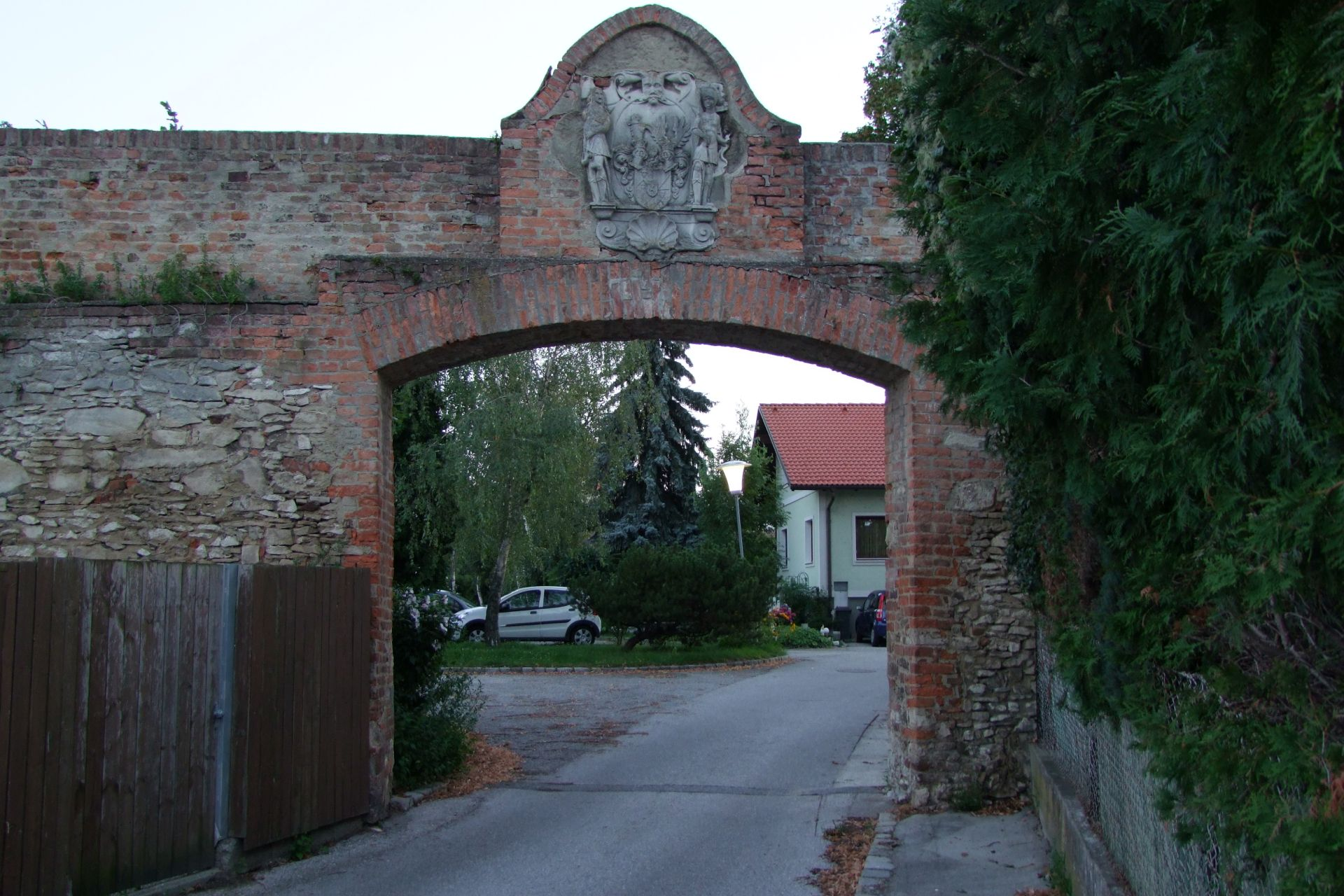
Ebenfurth

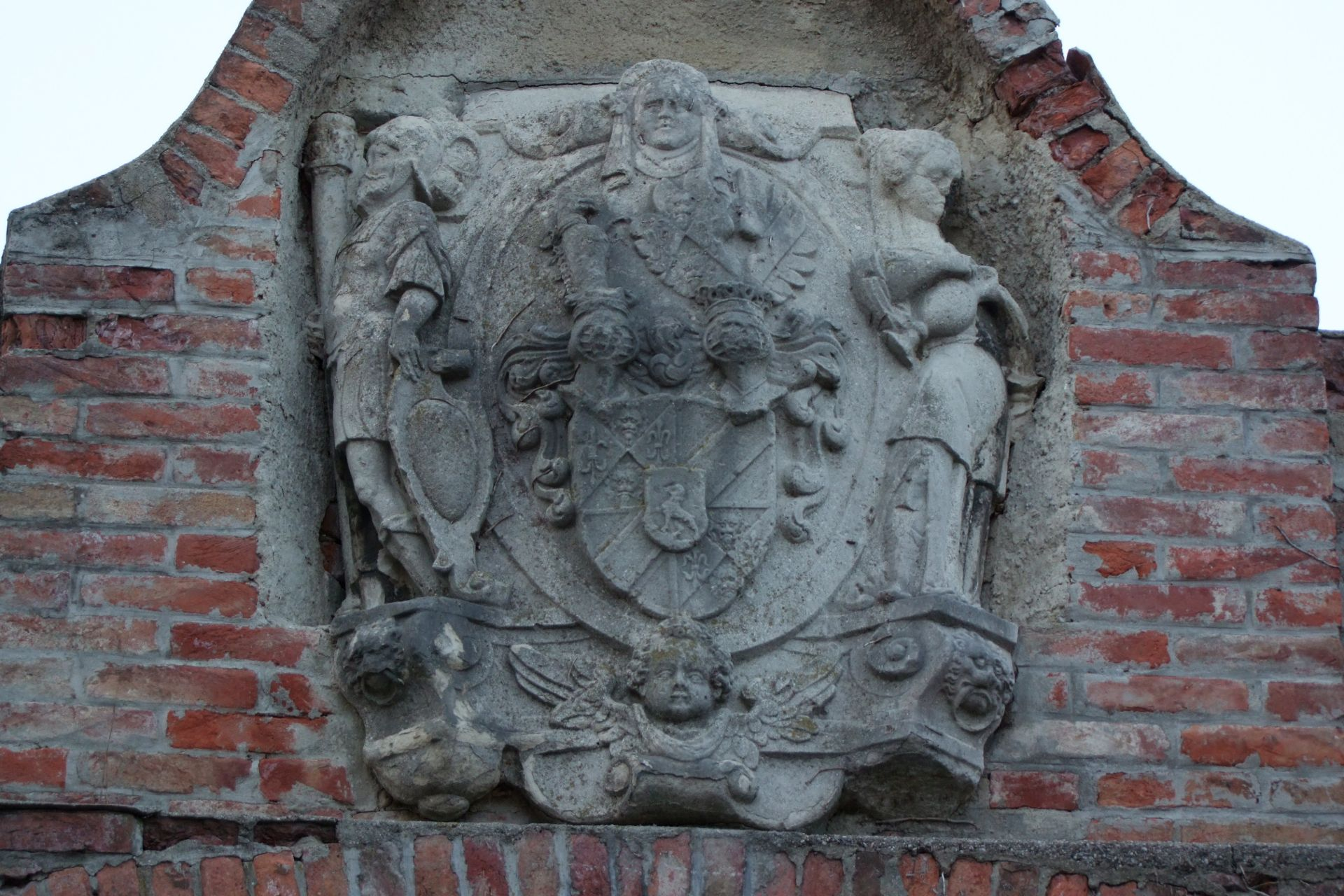
Ebenfurth Stadtmauer Annator-2Stadtmauer Annator-3

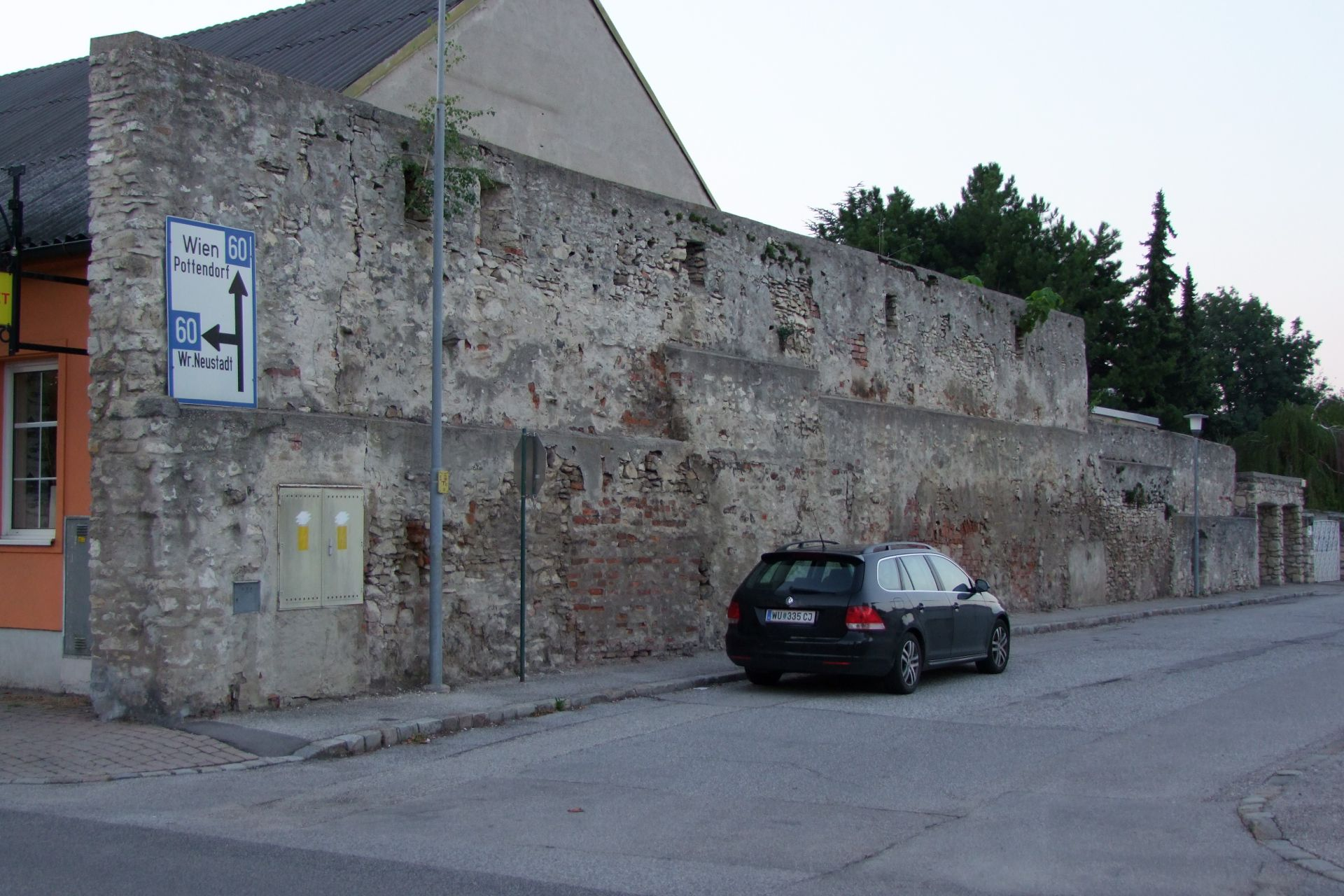
Ebenfurth Stadtmauer

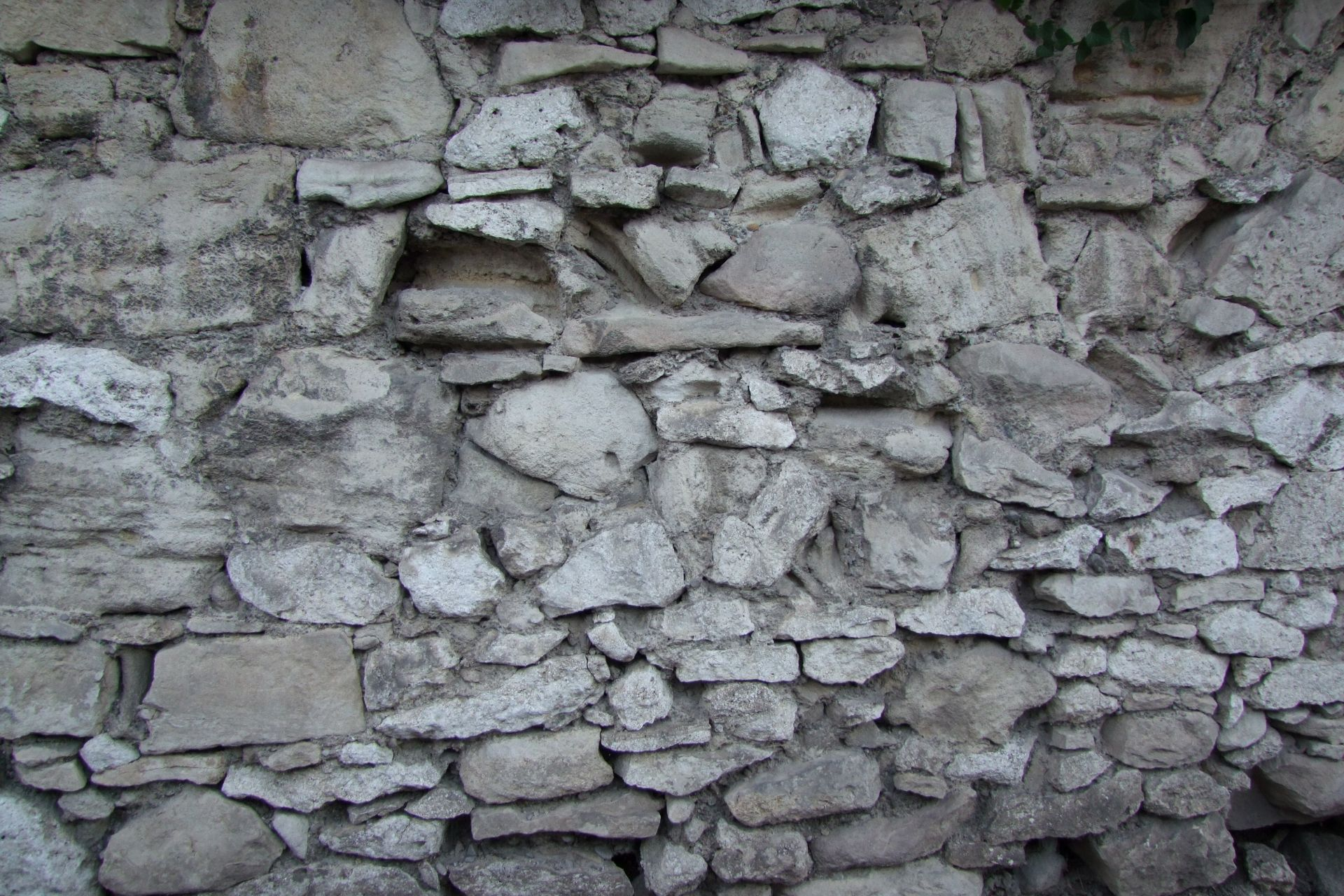
Ebenfurth Stadtmauer-3
- Eggenburg. One of the best preserved town wall circuits in Austria, with the remains of the castle at the southwest on a craggy promontory jutting into river Schmida. Market mentioned in 1180, charter granted in 1277 forum novum. On the west the wall runs along the edge of a cliff alongside the Schmida to the Kanzlerturm (built c. 1405) on the NW. On the north side from the Kanzlerturm there is a long length of wall, with a walkway behind a parapet, and evidence for a moat in front and the remains of the Wahrsagerturm. On the east is a length of wall with the Klosterturm, and with the Hohlturm or Swedish tower on the southeast corner. The Southern gate tower has disappeared but the wall continues back towards the castle with evidence for two further towers.
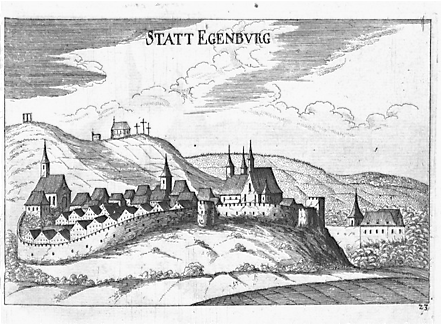
Eggenburg, Lower Austria by Georg Mätthaus in 1672

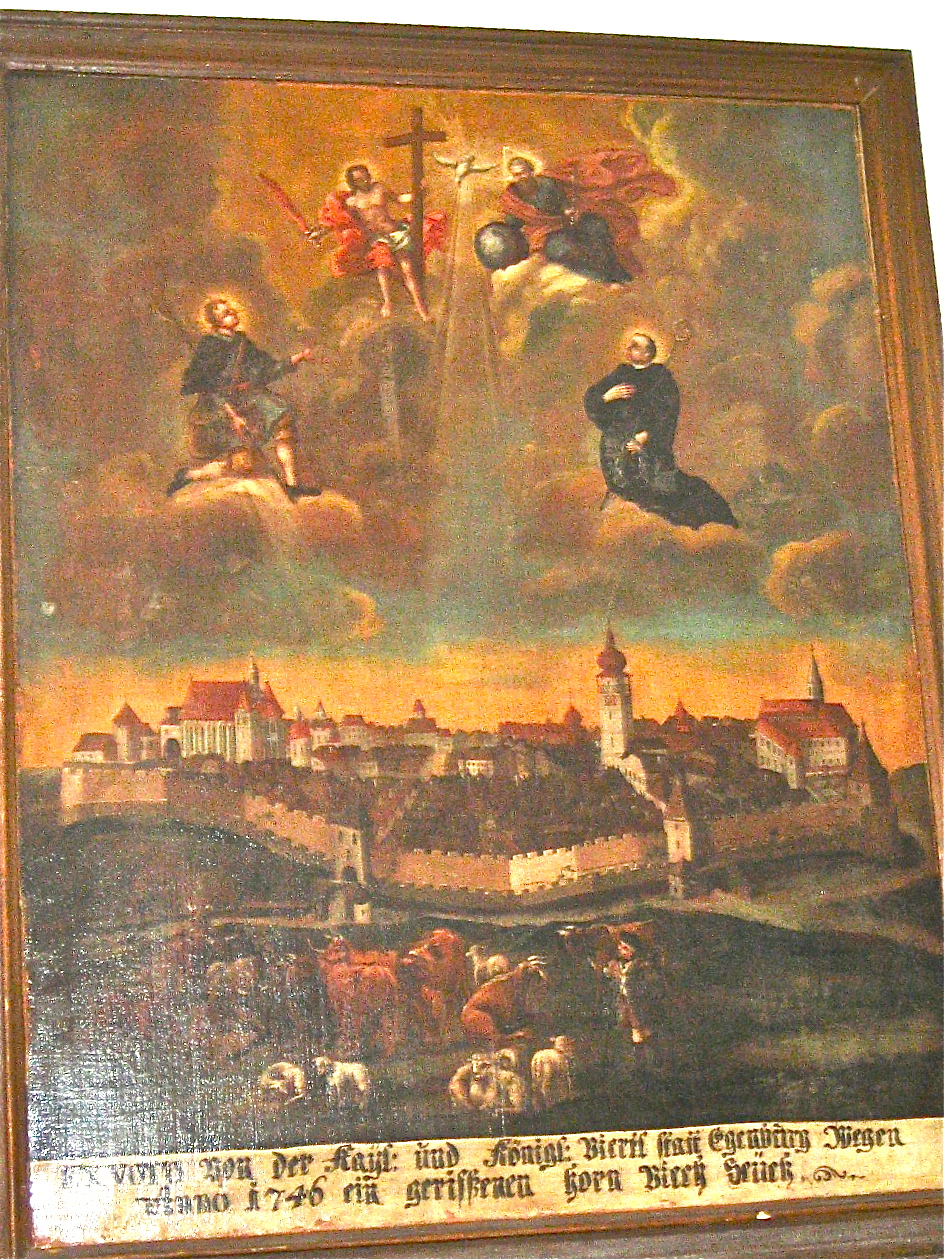
Painting of Eggenburg c 1730

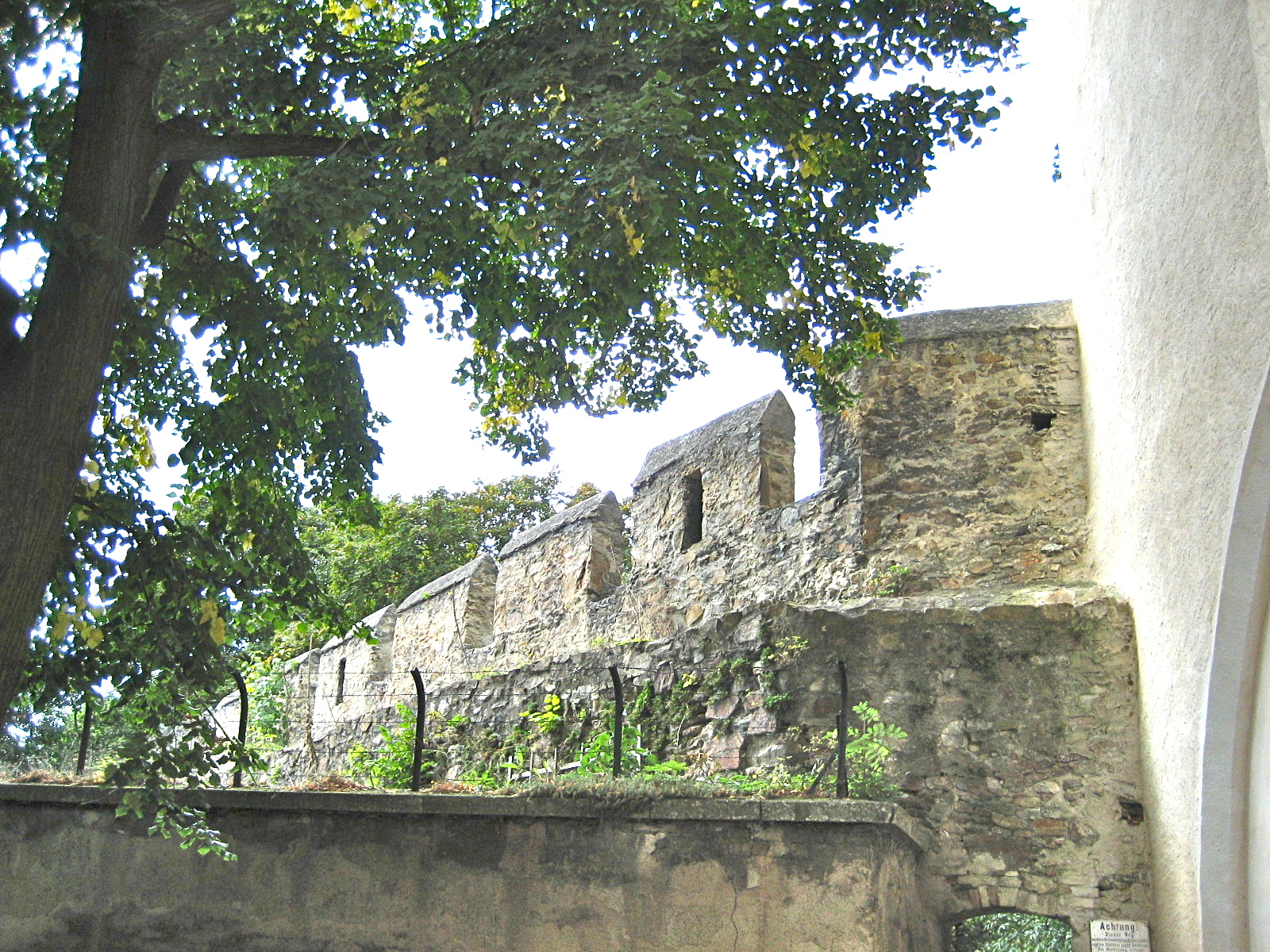
Crenellated wall near the church in Eggenburg

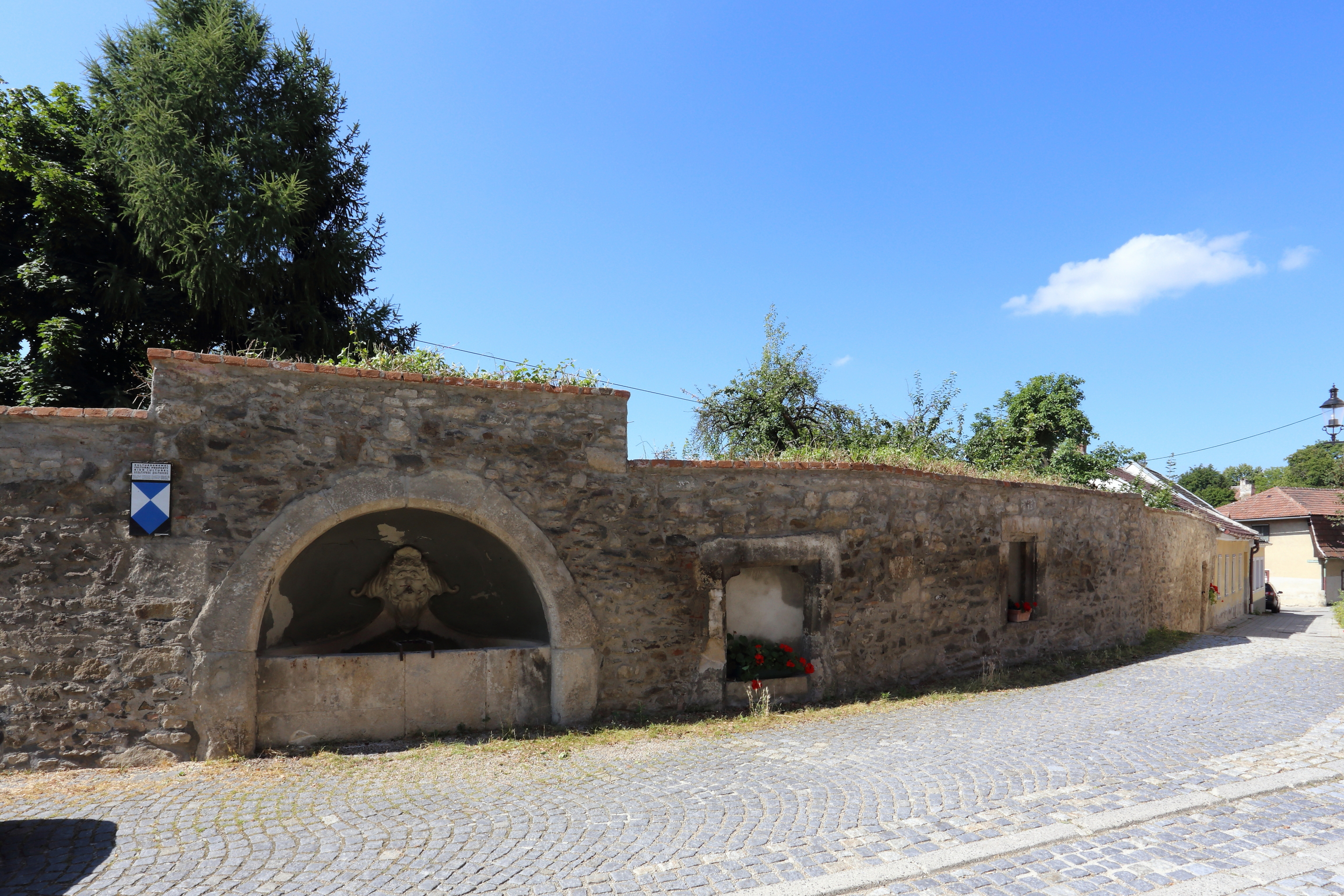
Eggenburg - Stadtmauer und Brunnen, Kirchengasse 5

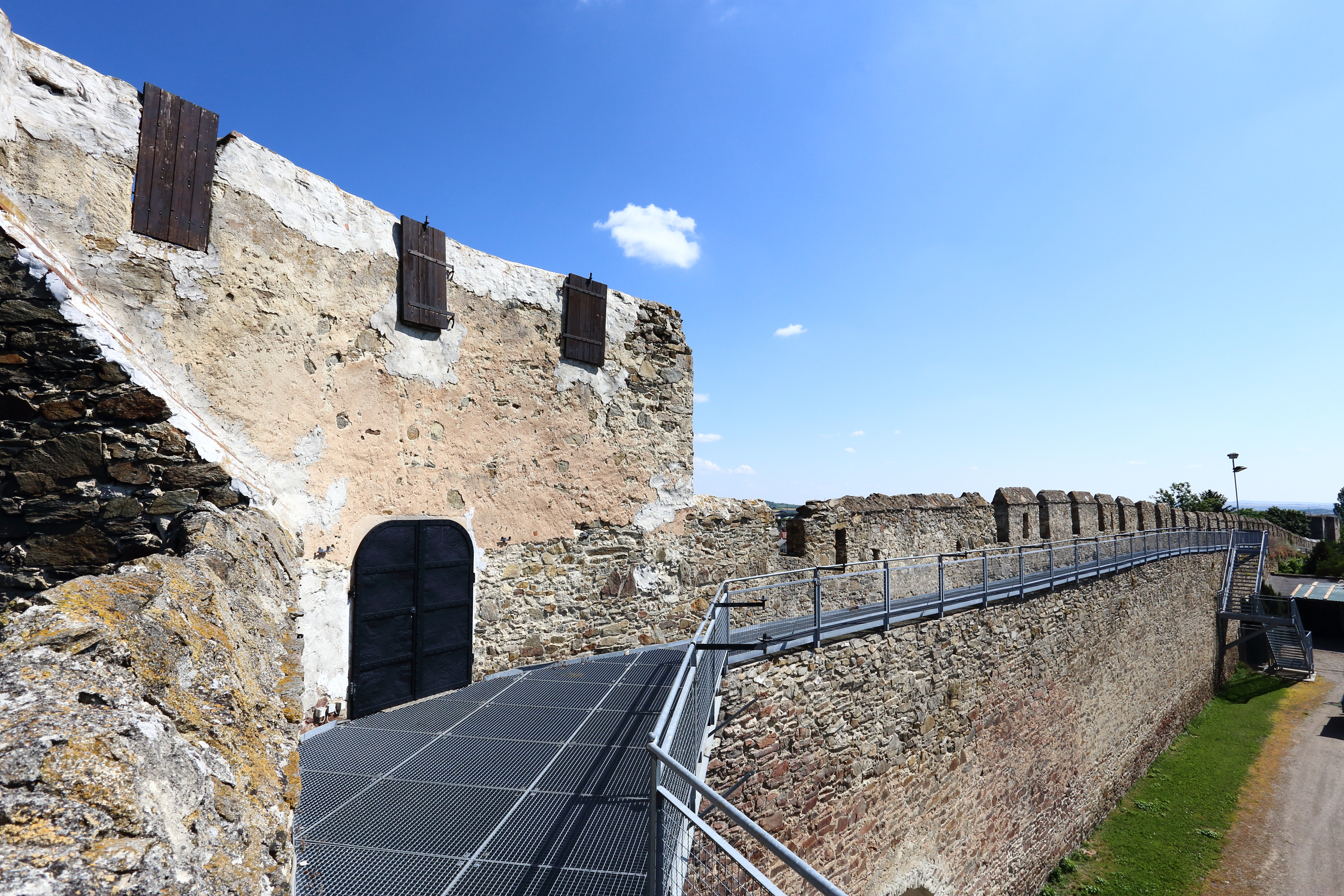
Eggenburg - Stadtmauer, nordseitig

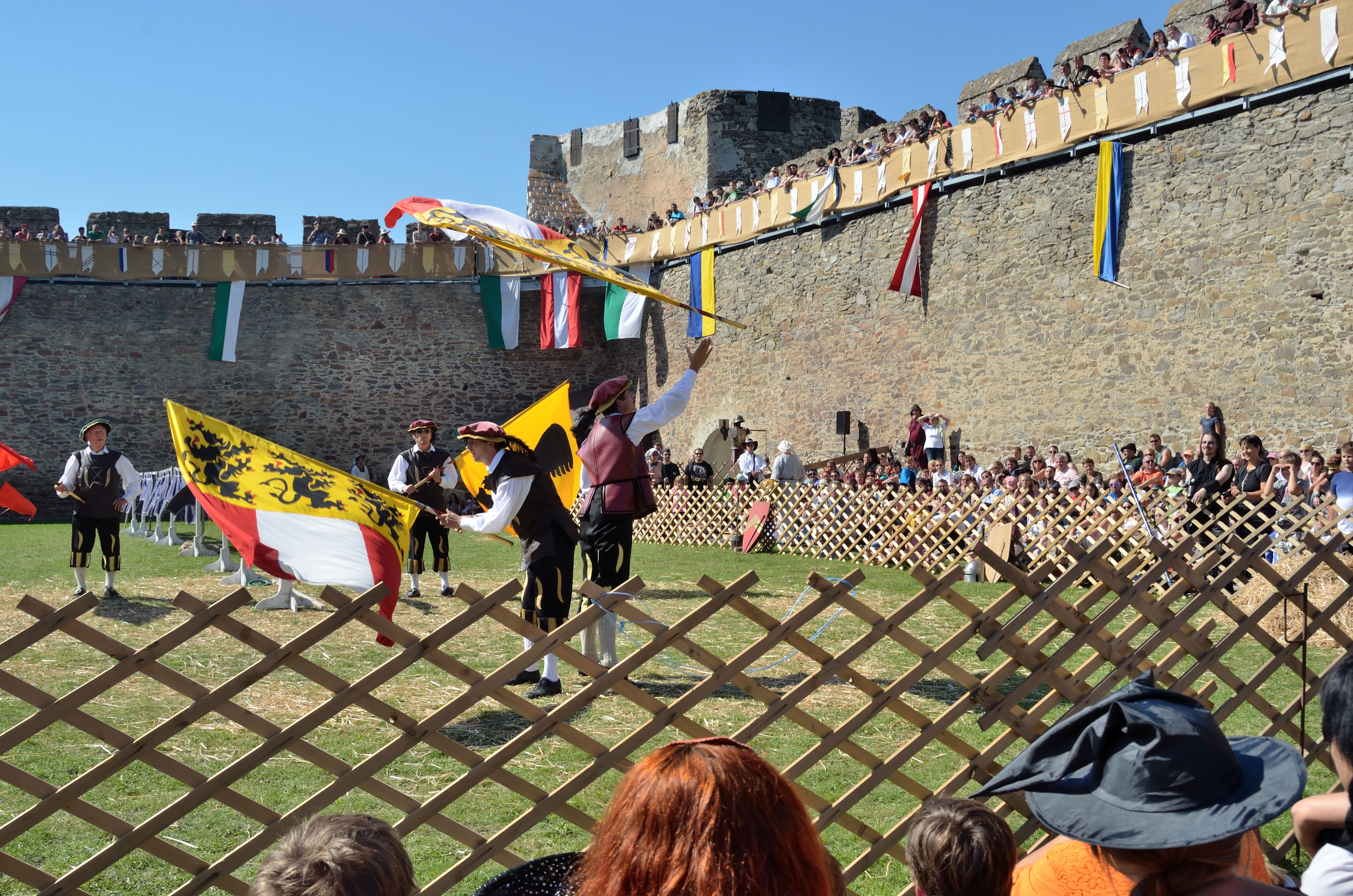
Klagenfurter Fahnenschwinger at Eggenburg

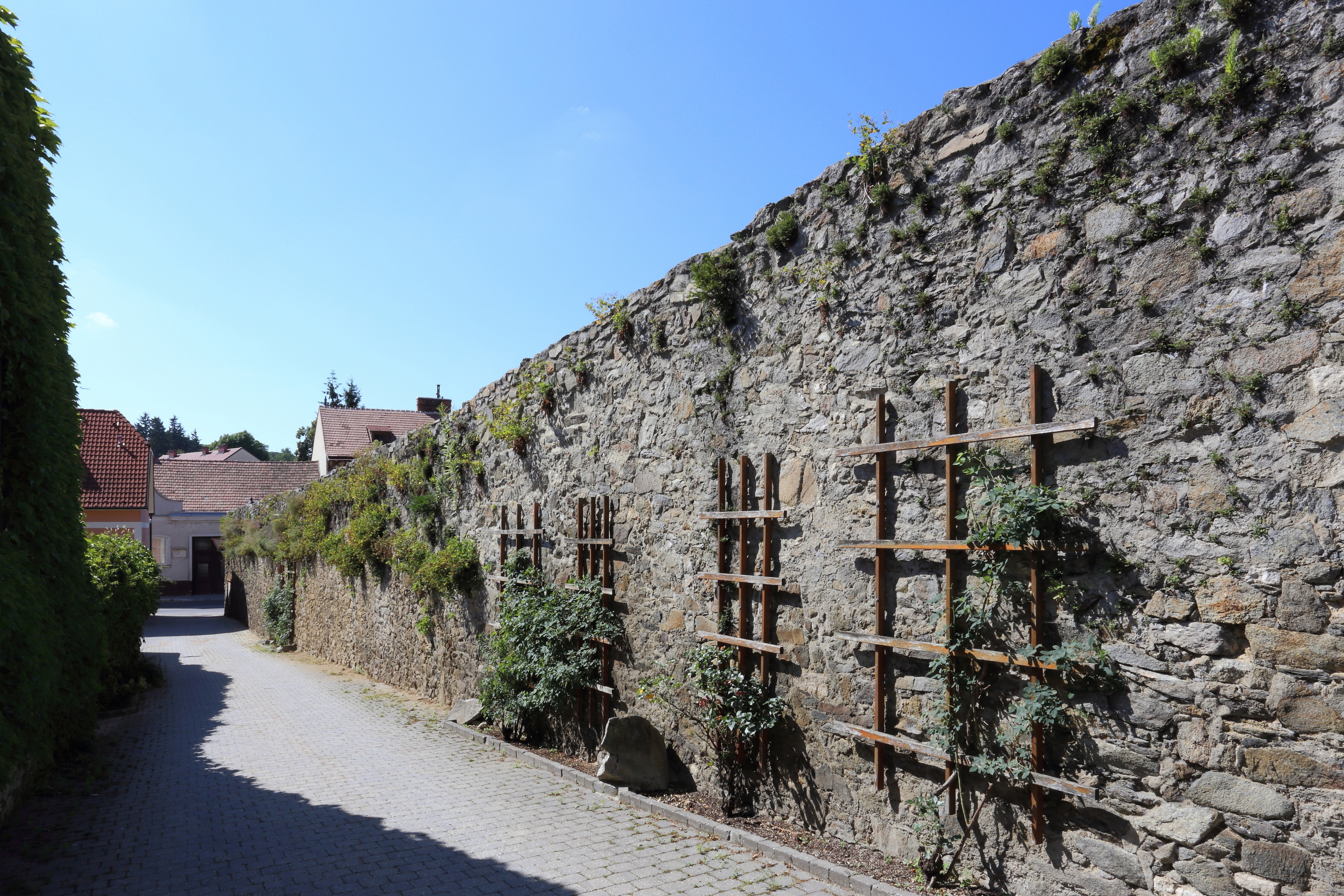
Eggenburg - Stadtmauer, Schlossgasse

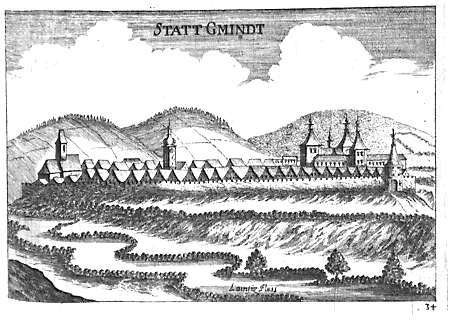
Gmünd, Lower Austria by Georg Mätthaus Vischer in 1672

- Gmünd was situated at the confluence of the Lunsenitze Lainsitz and Schremelitze Braunau on the border between Austria and Bohemia. The castle was established and the town laid-out by the Kuenringer Hadmar II, sometime in the last quarter of the 12th century. By 1208 Gmünd was being mentioned as a stadt. Today the gate-towers have disappeared, but many lengths of wall survive incorporated into adjacent houses
- Gross-Enzersdorf has one of the most complete walled circuits in Lower Austria, although the three gates were finally removed in 1886. The town was originally sited on the former Sachengang Island in the river Danube and is first mentioned in 870 as a 'Meierhof, – probably a royal manor – that was held by the Engelschalk family. This passed to the Bishopric of Passau and in 1202 Groß-Enzersdorf came into the control of the Bishops of Freising. At this time a market is mentioned at Groß-Enzersdorf. A charter was granted to the town in 1396 and Bishop of Freising, Berthold of Wehningen, who was also at the time Chancellor of Austria, arranged for a wall to be built, completed in 1399. Builders who had previously been working on St Stephen's cathedral in Vienna, were brought in and stone and building materials were transported from the Roman site at Carnuntum. During the assault on Vienna in 1529, the Turks conquered and devastated the town. Subsequently, Croats were brought in to resettled the town. The town was again taken by the Turks at the second siege of Vienna in 1683. In the Thirty Years War Swedish cavalry looted and burned the town. In 1809 the town was taken by Napoleonic forces prior to the nearby battle of Aspern.The walls stand to about six metres with the crunulations still largely intact. The length of standing wall is about 2.2 kilometre and the wall varies in thickness from 90 to 160 centimetres. The walls have a row of putlog holes on the outside, below the crenellations, suggesting that a wood hoarding existed, The defences were surrounded by moat, which were partially waterfilled until the early 19th century. The layout of the defended area is irregular, suggesting that additional areas must have been taken in when the wall was built. There is a round tower at the most northern point and the remains of a rectangular tower set into the wall on the NE. The Vischer print of Groß-Enzersdorf of 1672 shows the town from the south looking towards the Wasser or Lobau gate-tower. There were also two other gatetowers, the Wittau on the east and the Raasdorf or Vienna gate on the NE.
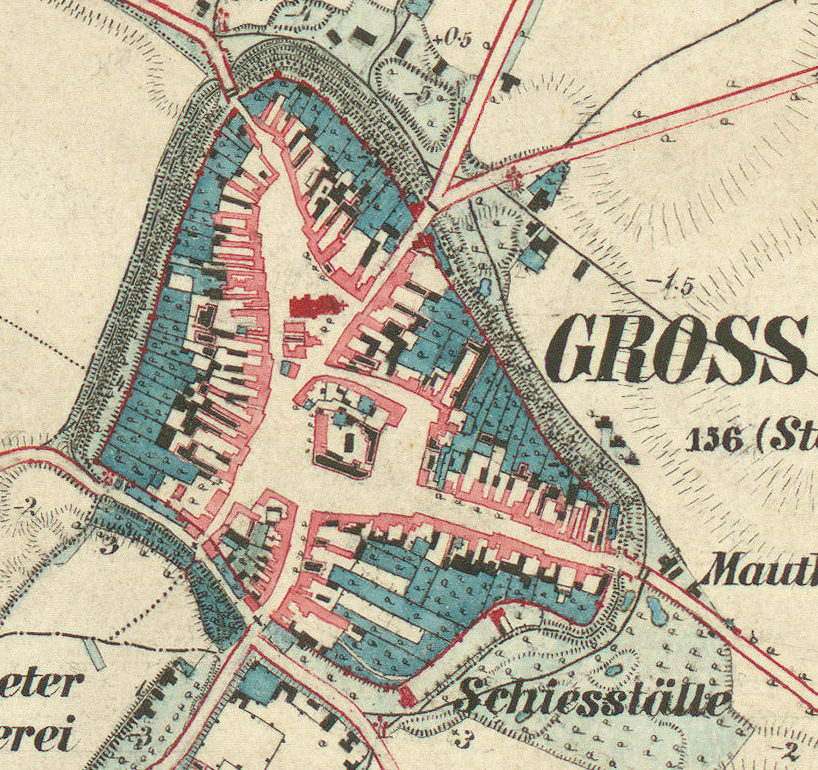
Gross-EnzersdorfFranziszeische Landesaufnahme c. 1830

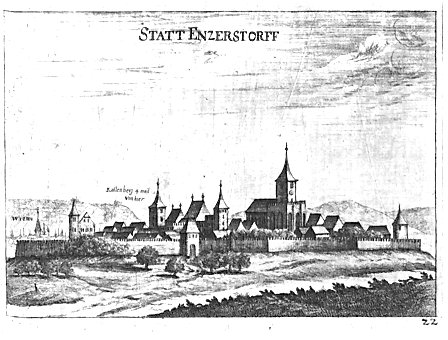
Gross-Enserzerdorf, Lower Austria by Georg Mätthaus Vischer 1672.

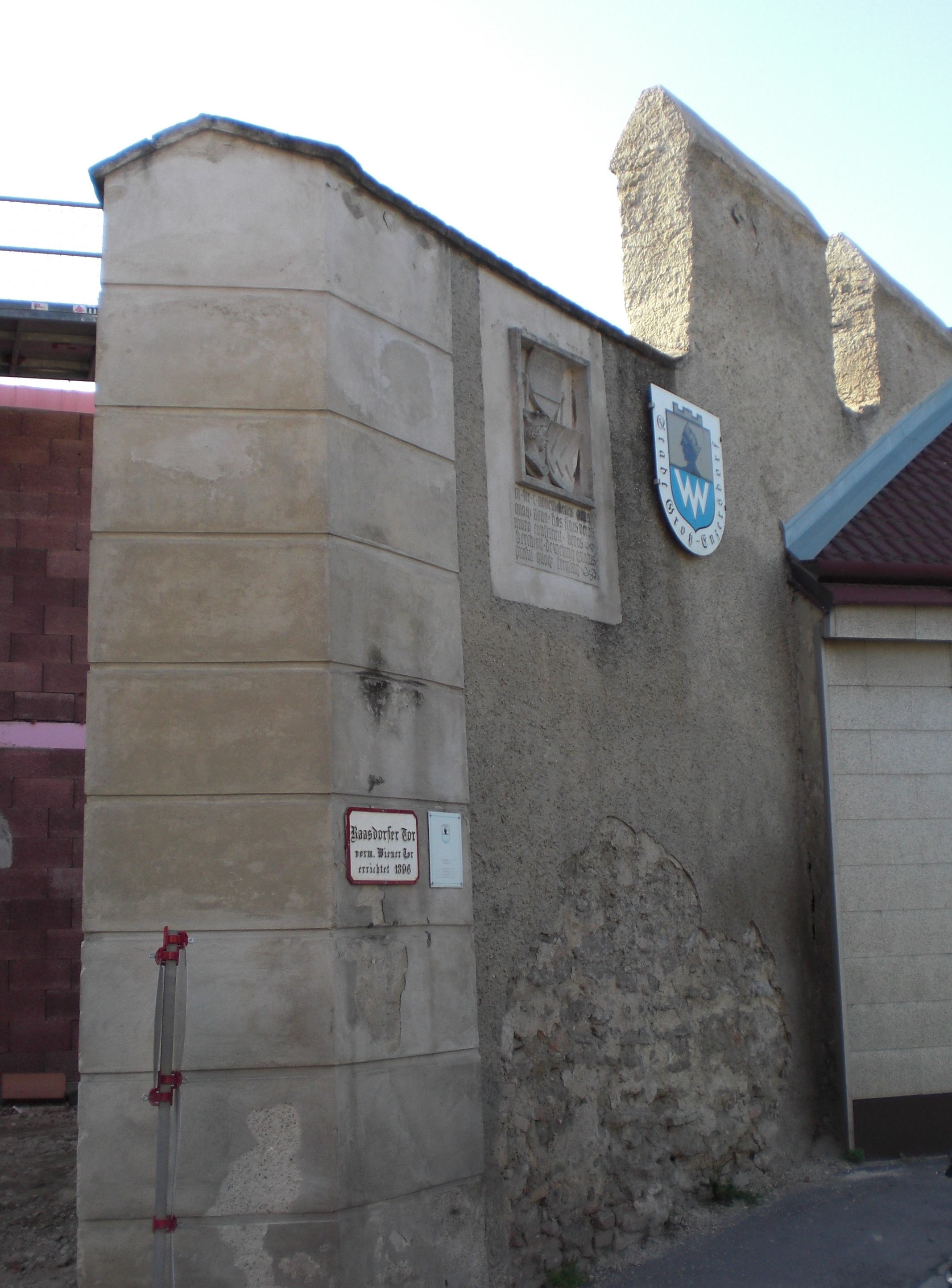
Town walls at Raasdorfer Gateway, Groß-Enzersdorf
- Hainburg consists of possibly the most complete of the Austrian walled towns with three surviving gates, eleven towers and only a short length of wall and a tower between the Weintertor and the Danube missing. Hainburg was recognised as an Imperial Fortress by the Reichstag of Nuremberg in 1050 as a border fortification. In 1200 Hainburg was granted Stapelrecht. The Weinertor, the gateway that faces towards Vienna is particularly impressive. The lower section, part of which is of a ‘double drum’ or ‘Doppelturmtoren’ construction, was built in the second half of the 13th century and is reminiscent of a Roman gateway. Similar double drum gates can be seen at the Marshiertor at Aachen, the Hahnentor at Cologne and at Metz. The massive upper storey of the gate, supported by a gothic gable, was added by Ottokar II.
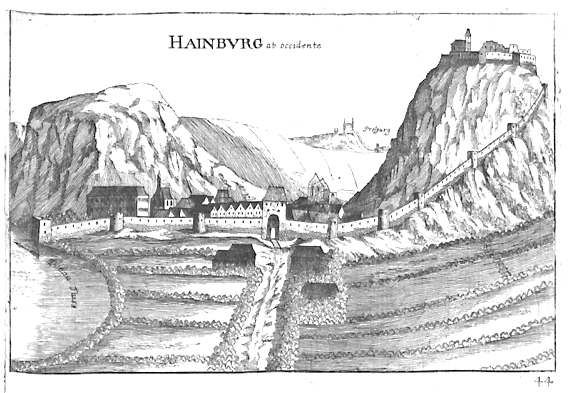
Hainburg Lower Austria by Georg Mätthaus Vischer in 1672

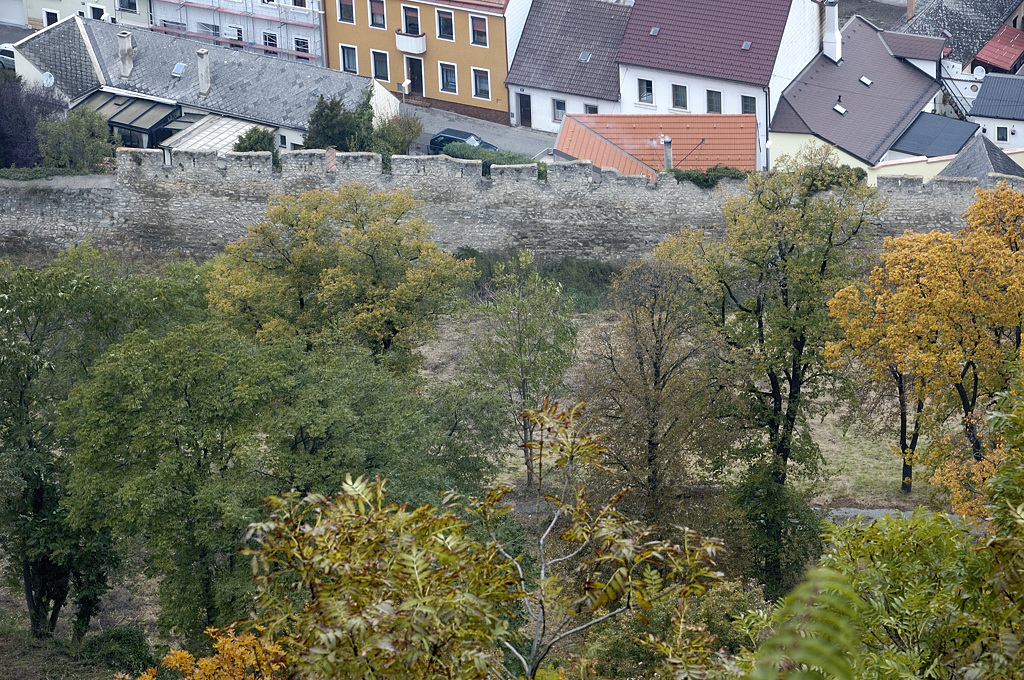
Marc Aurel-Kaserne - Stadtmauer

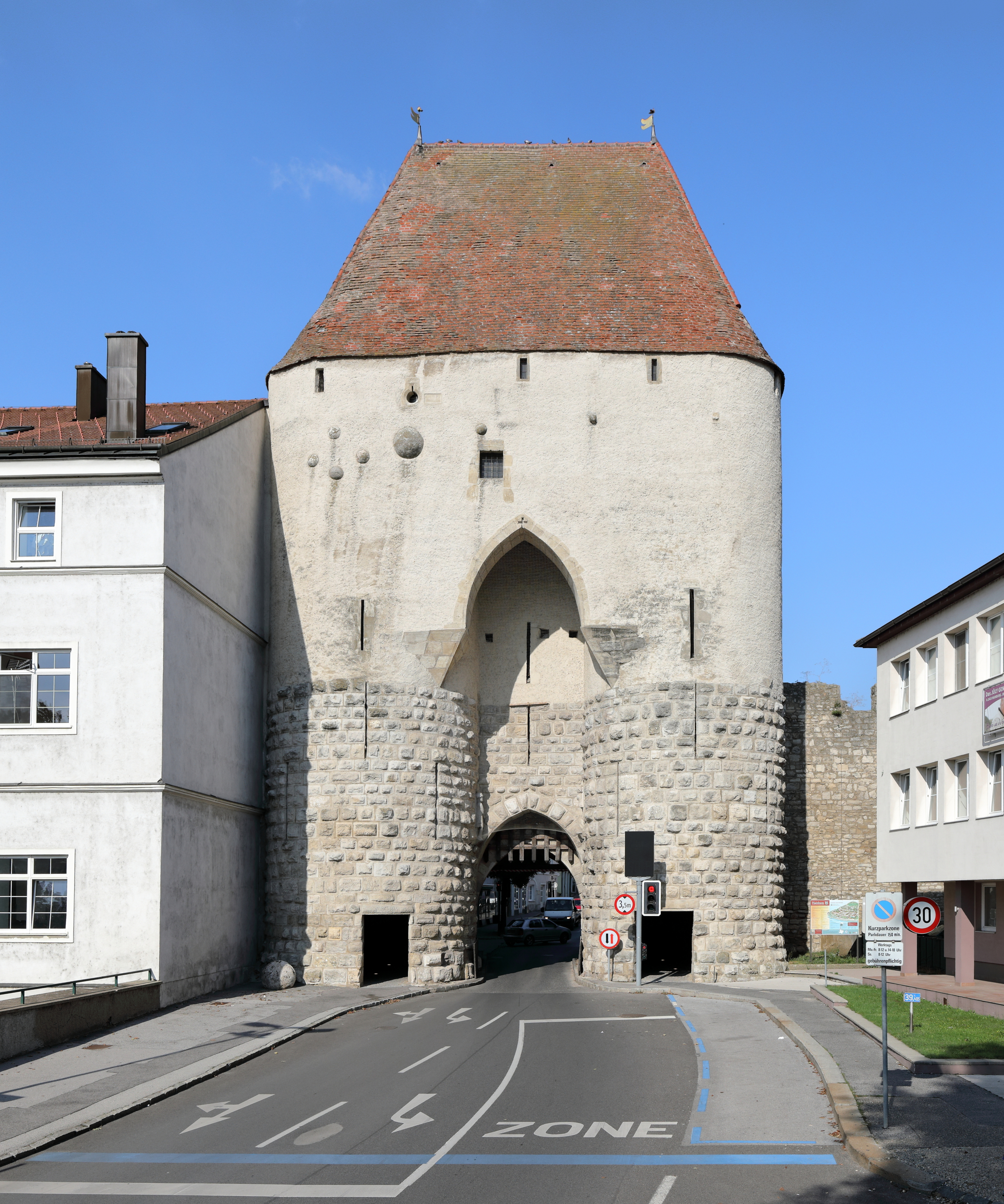
Hainburg WienerTor

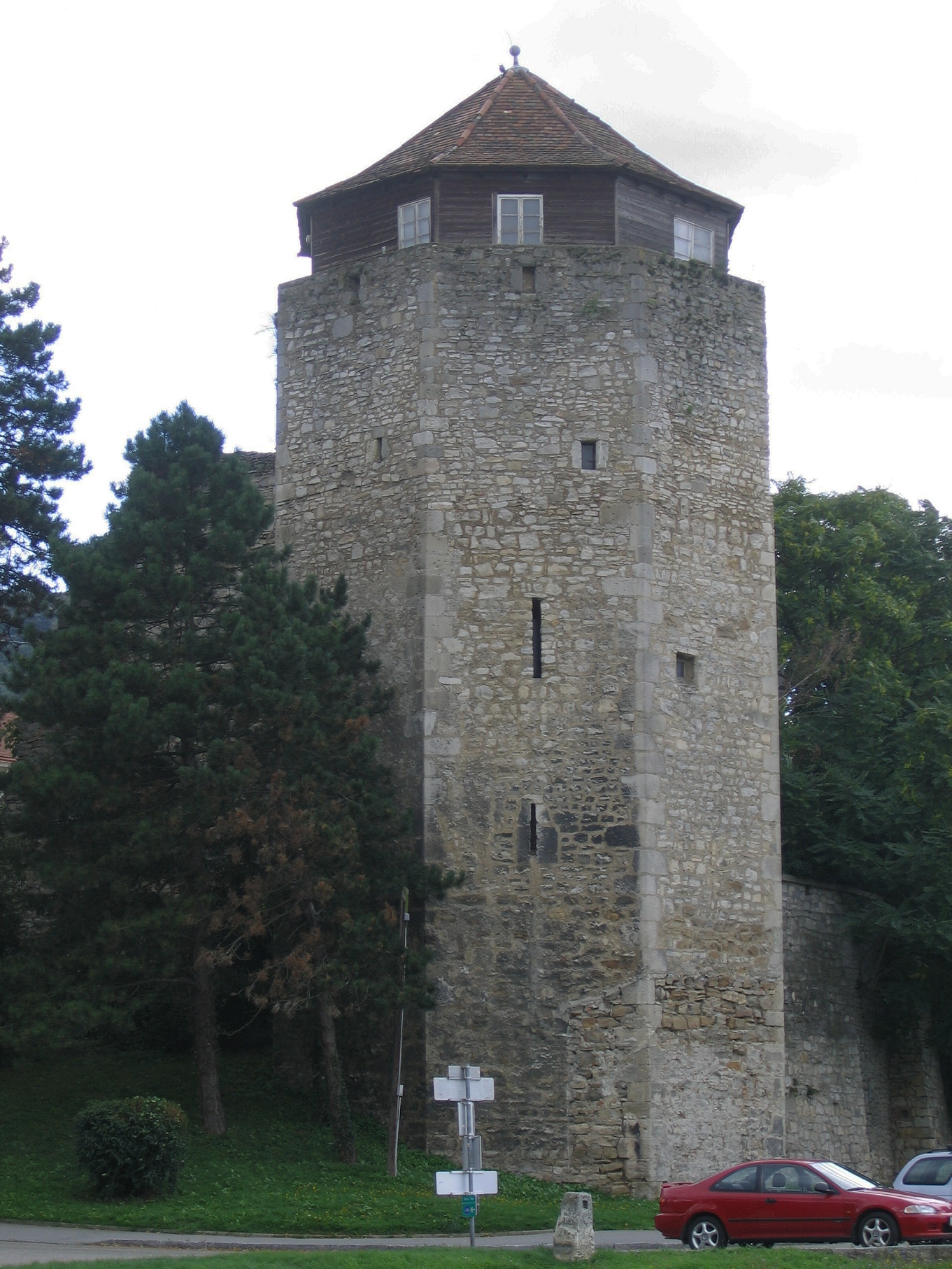
Hainburg Goetzenturm

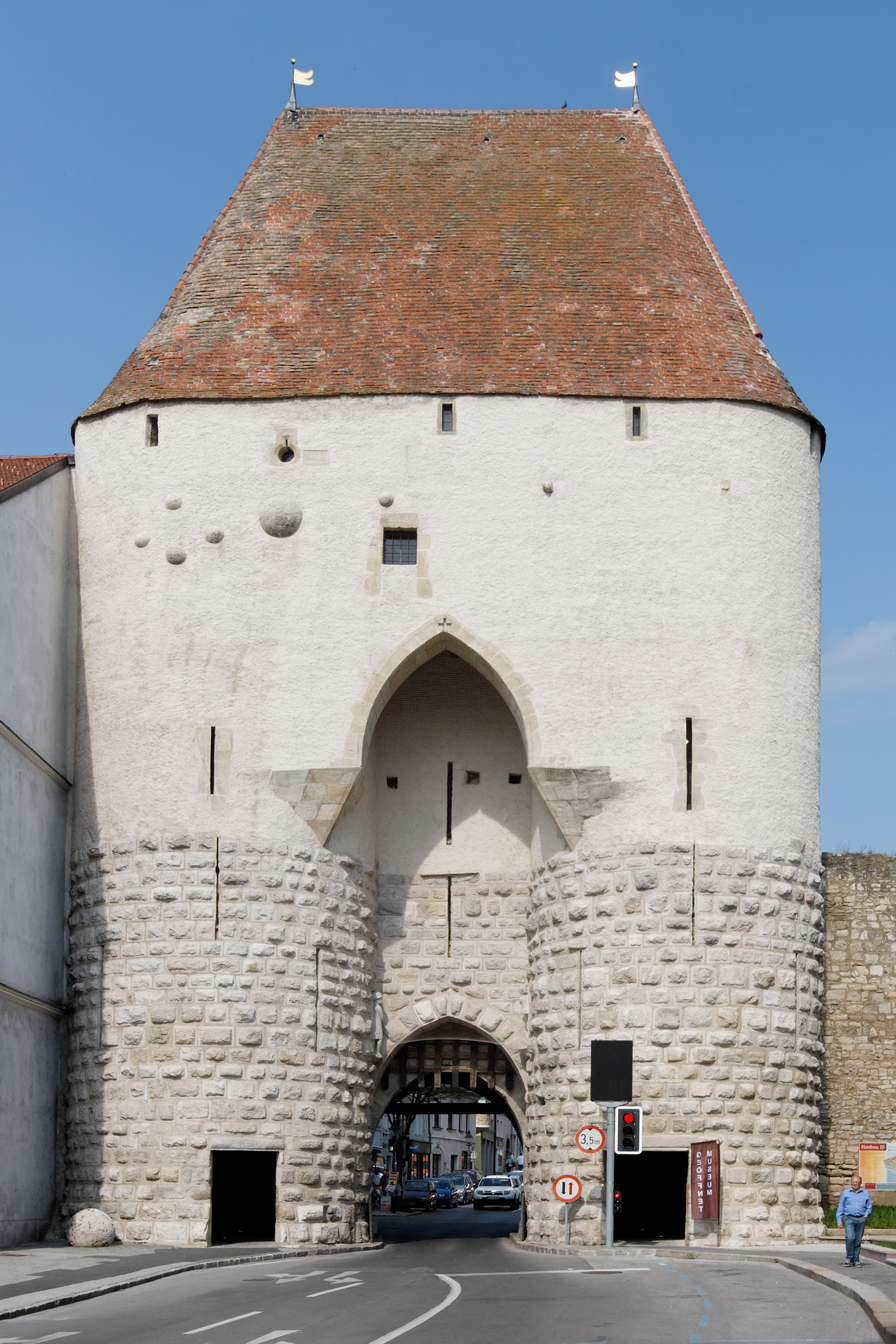
Hainburg Wienertor 2011

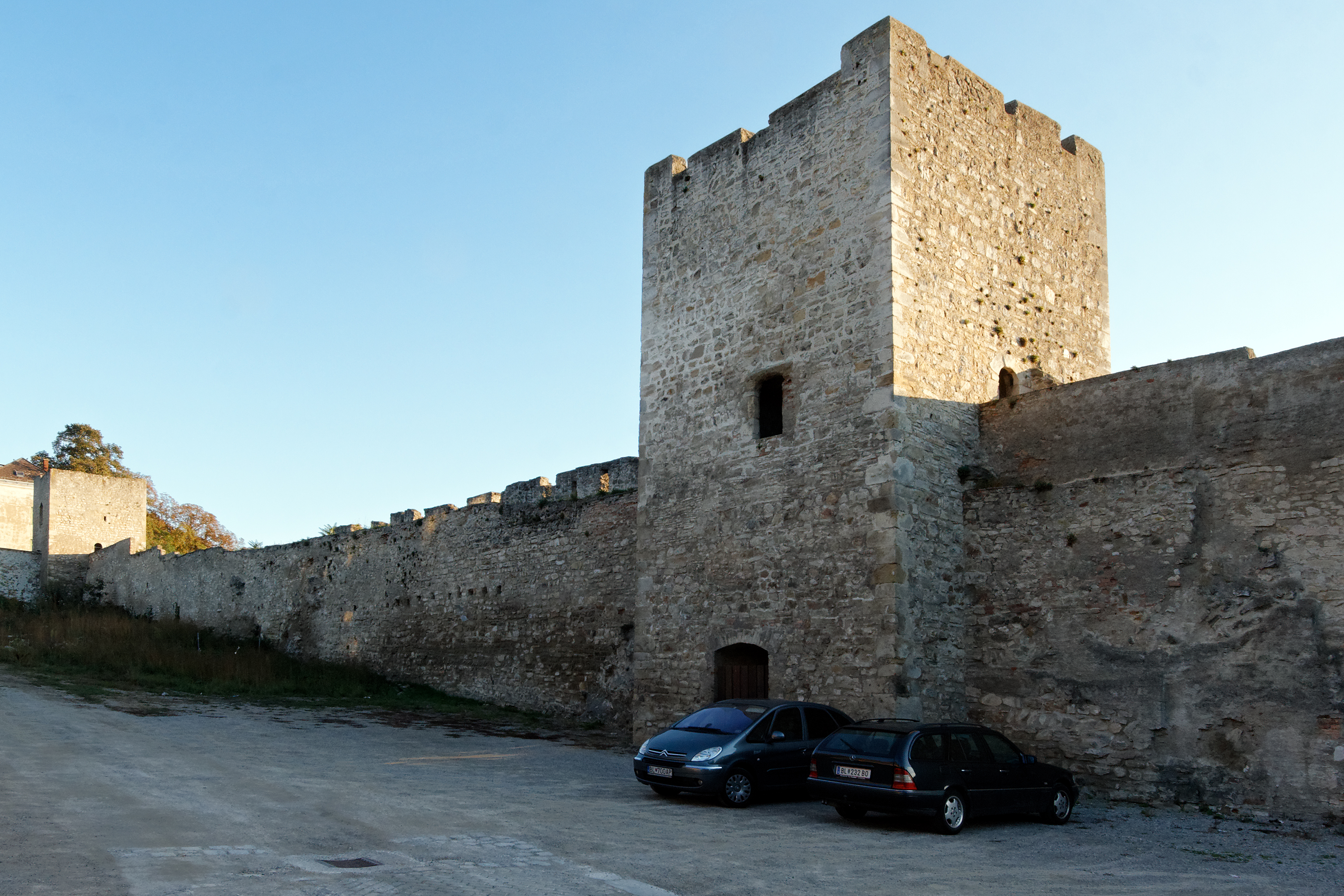
Hainburg Wehrturm Meierhof

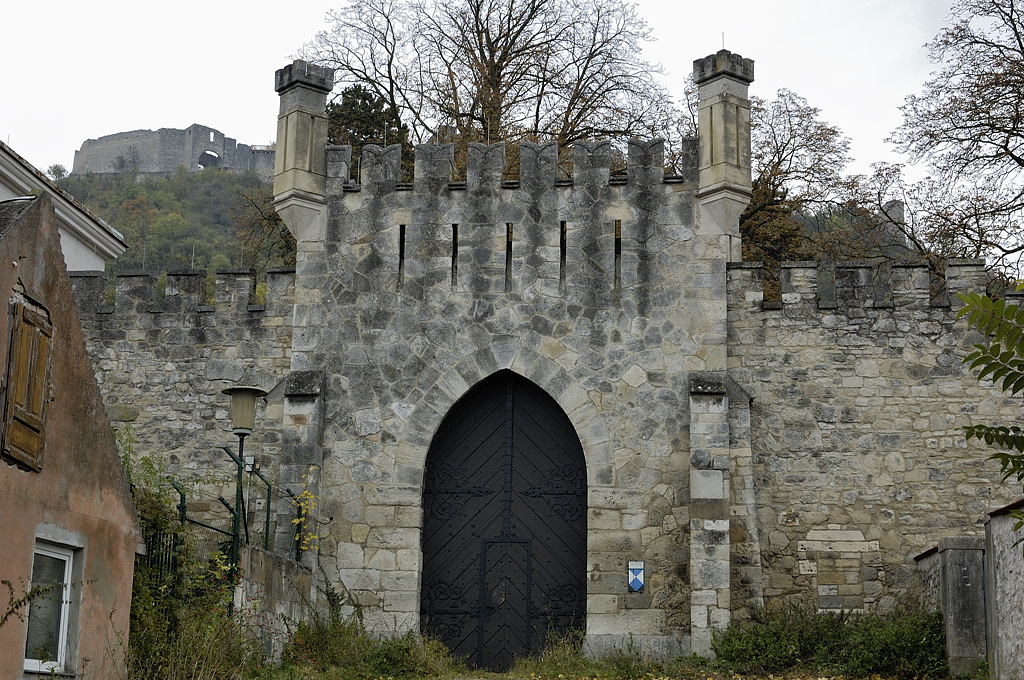
Stadtbefestigung Hainburg

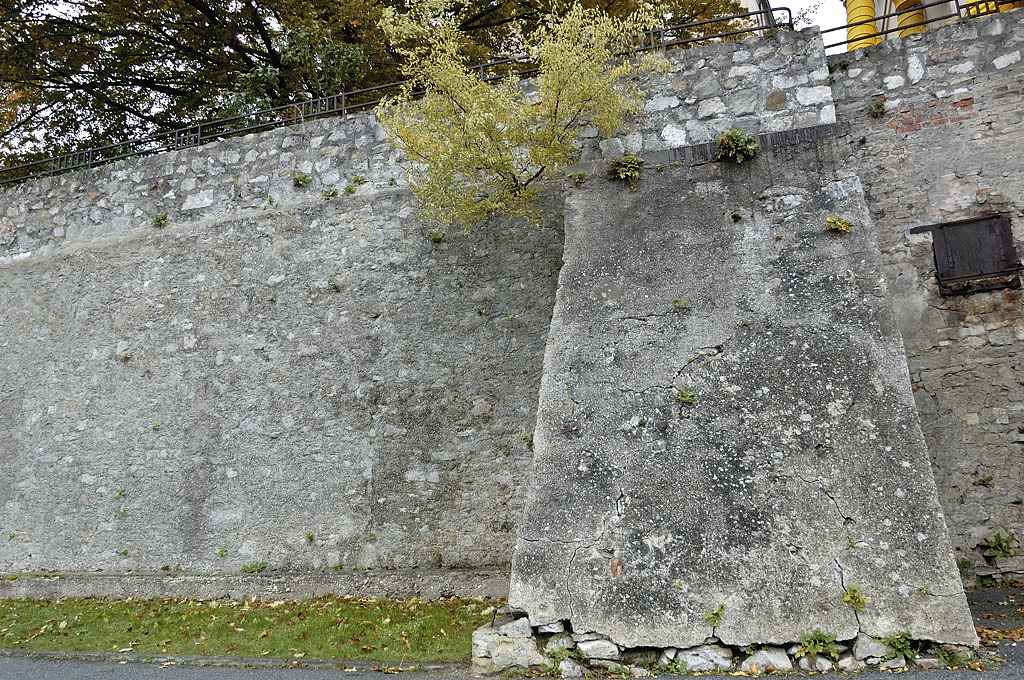
Teil d. Stadtmauer (zw. Haus Blutgasse 11 und Fischertor

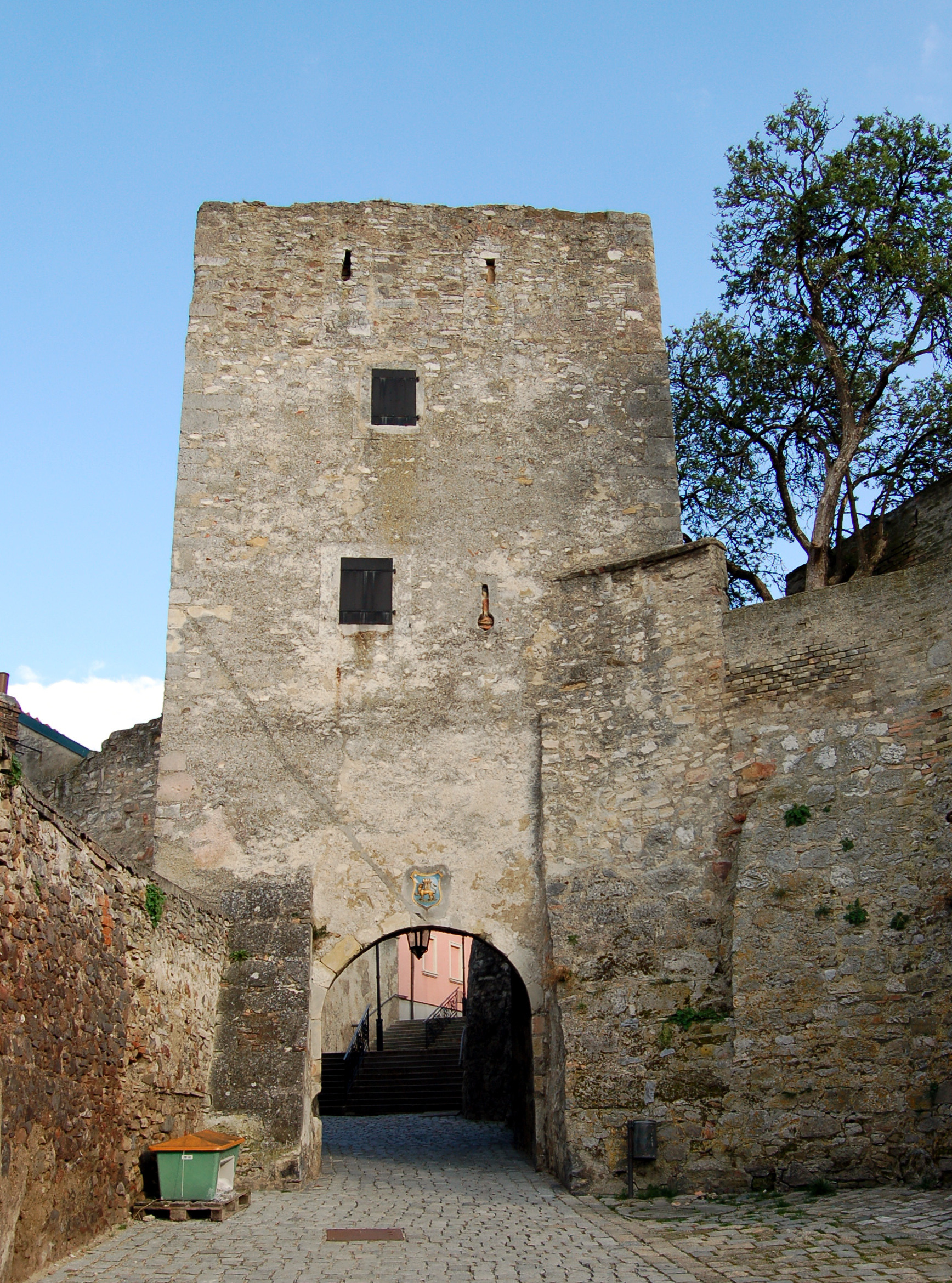
Hainburg Fischertor

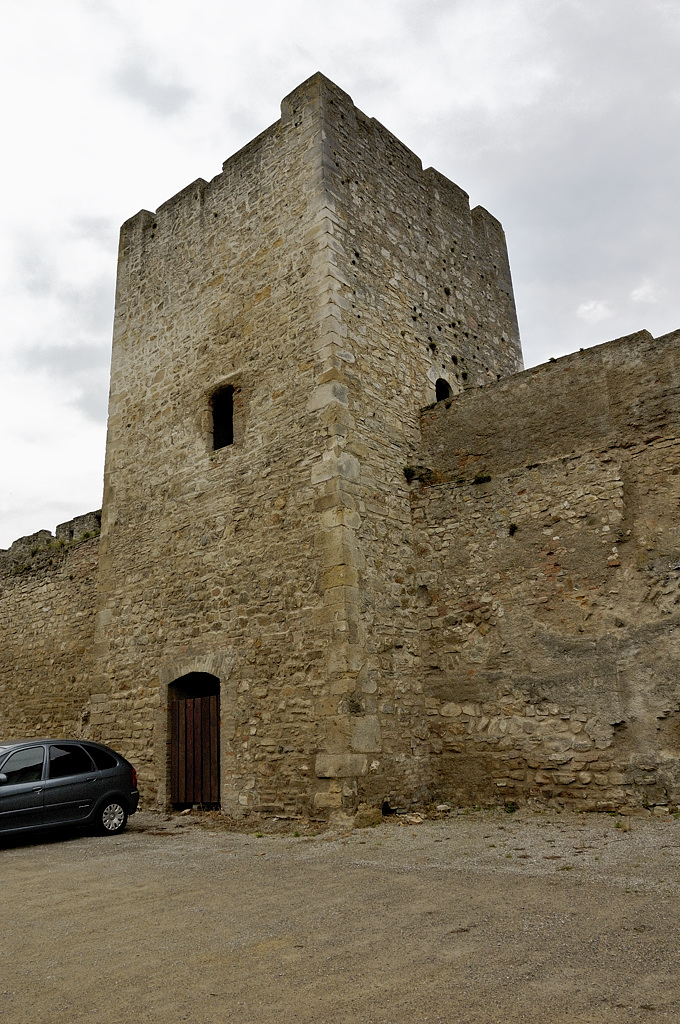
Marc Aurel-Kaserne - Stadtmauerturm

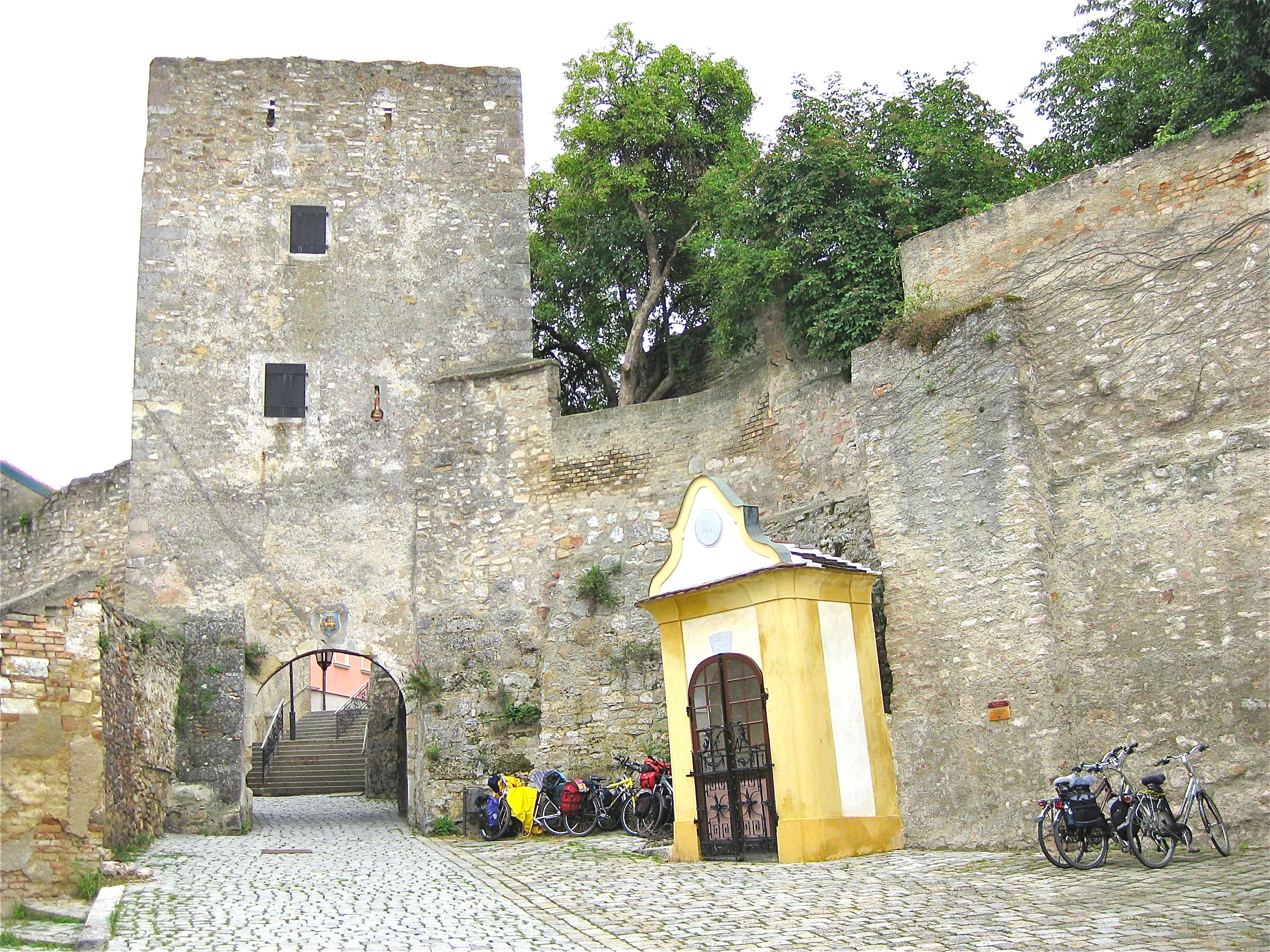
Hainburg, Fischertor.
- Hardegg. Overlooks the river Thaya on the Austrian border with Moravia. The castle was built by the Counts of Plaien around 1200. Mentioned as a stadt with fifty houses in 1363. One gate-tower and a length of wall remain today.
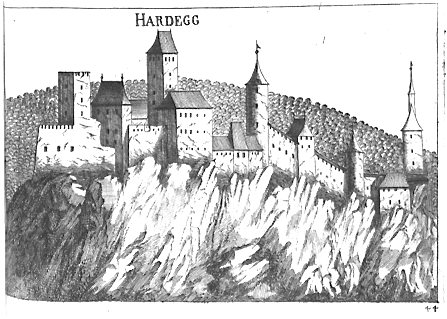
Hardegg, Lower Austria by Georg Mätthaus Vischer in 1672

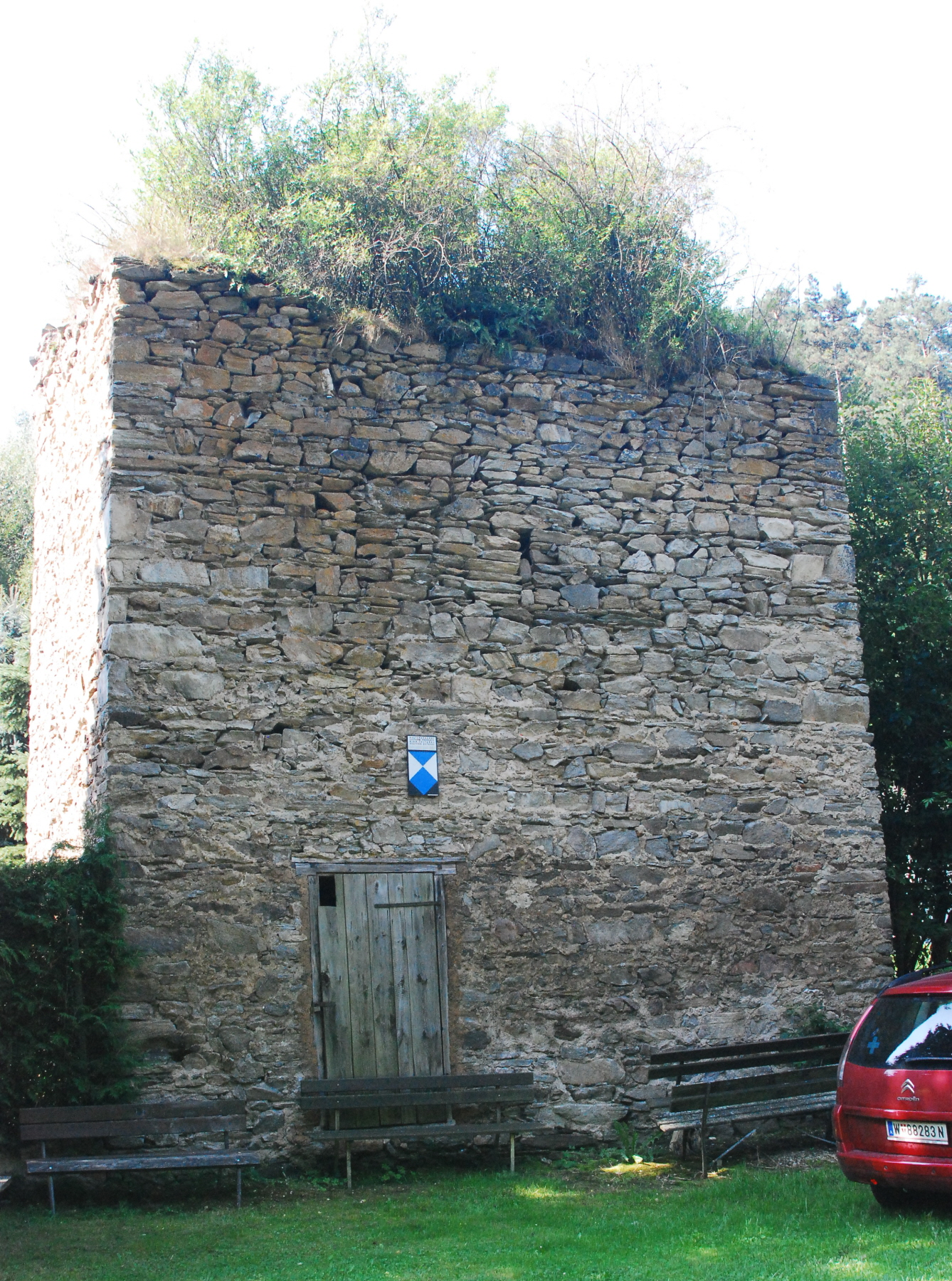
Hardegg Brandlesturm

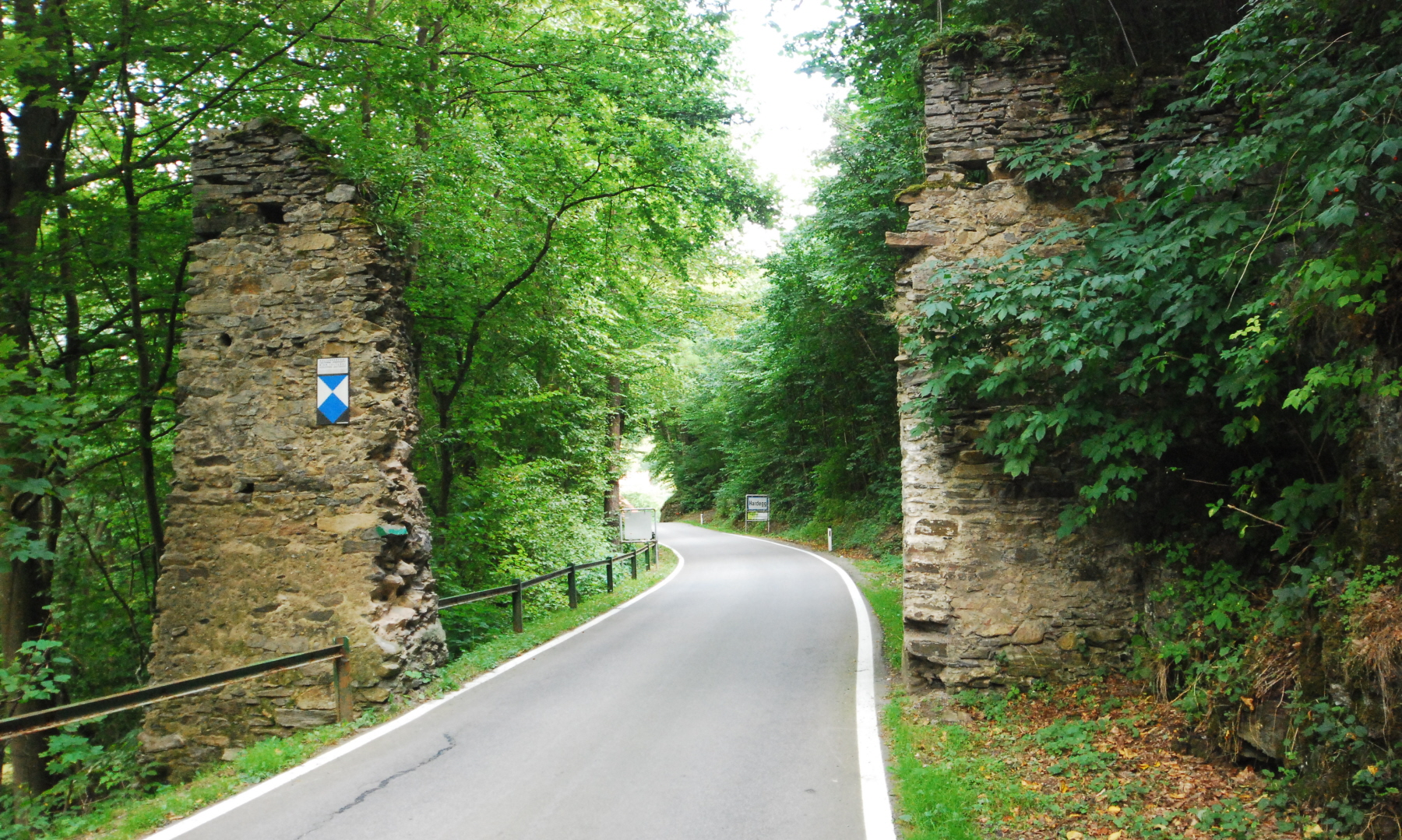
Hardegg site of Stadttor

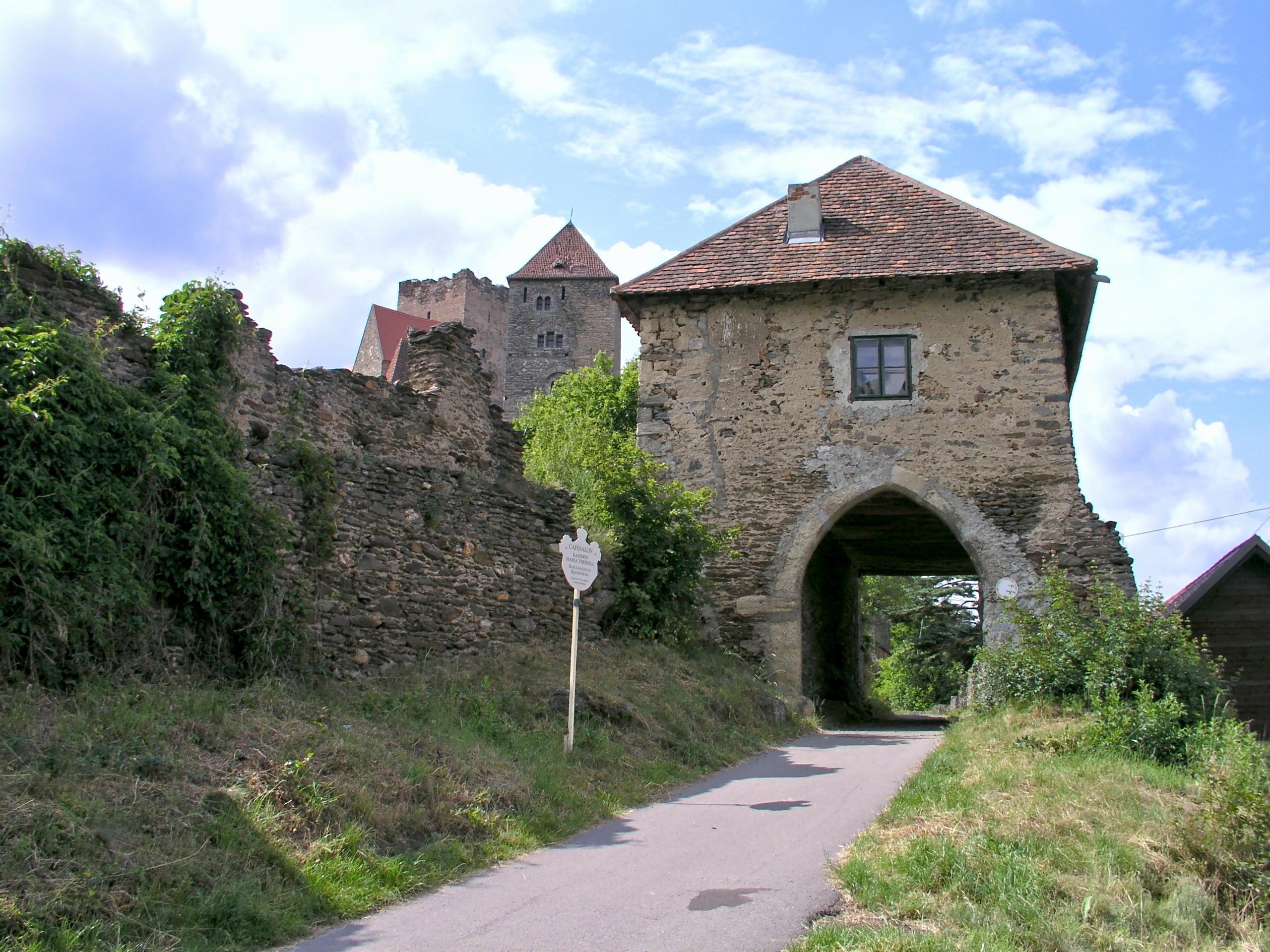
Hardegg - Burg - 13
- Herzogenburg. Founded by the Bavarians under Duke Tassilo III in the 9th century and divided into two parts with the earlier "Untere Markt" and the later "Obere Markt". The Vischer print of 1672 shows a walled town with a north gate and a west gate. The wall has largely disappeared and would have been on the line of the present day Schillerring. The gates have gone, but one of the two round towers between the gates is still there. To the north the ditch survives and there is one tower and remains of two further towers outside the precinct of the Monastery in the northeast corner. To the east there seems to have been a ditch incorporating a rivulet, and later defences may have been moved further east to the line of the Auring.
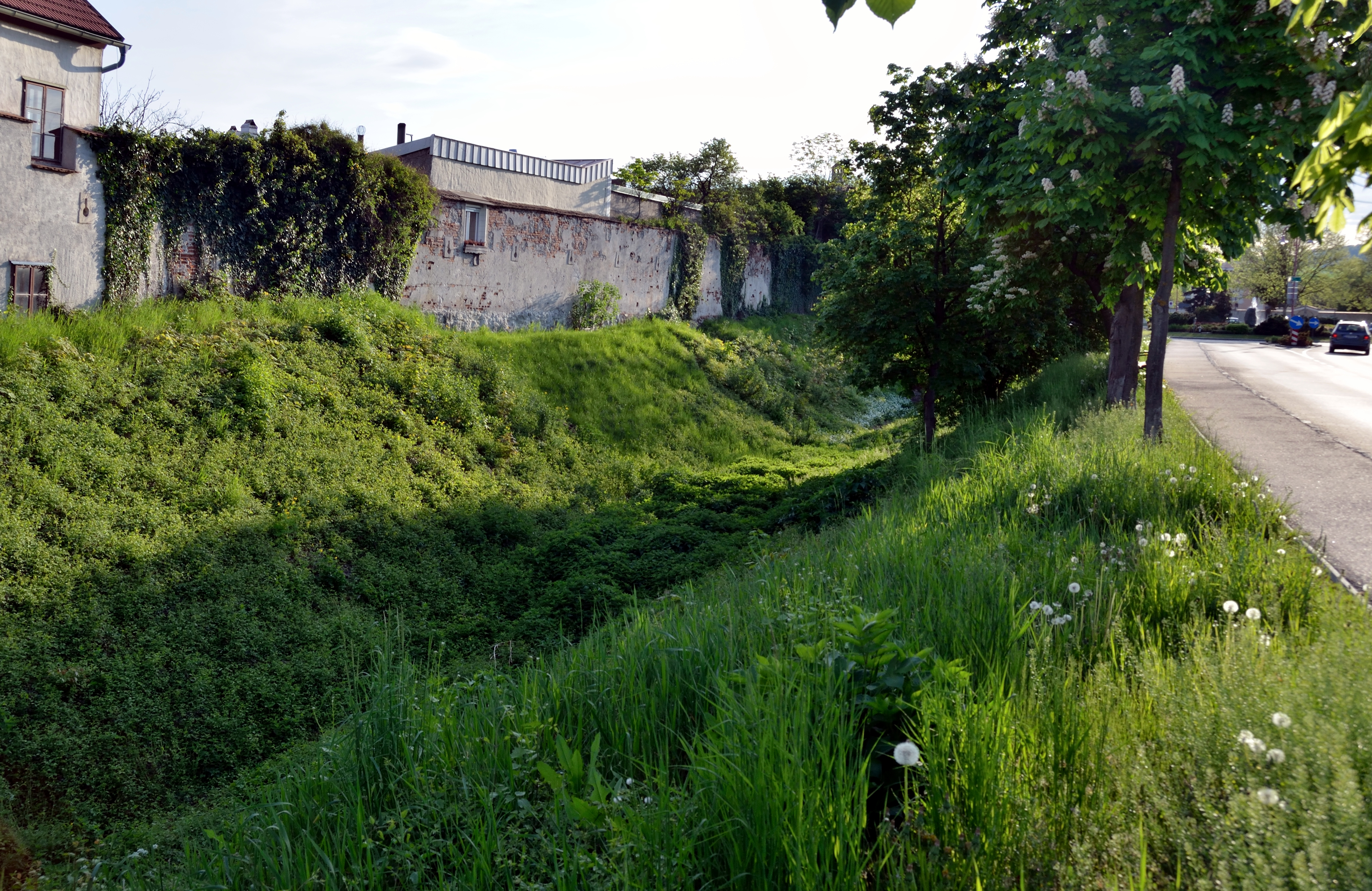
City wall Herzogenburg - moat

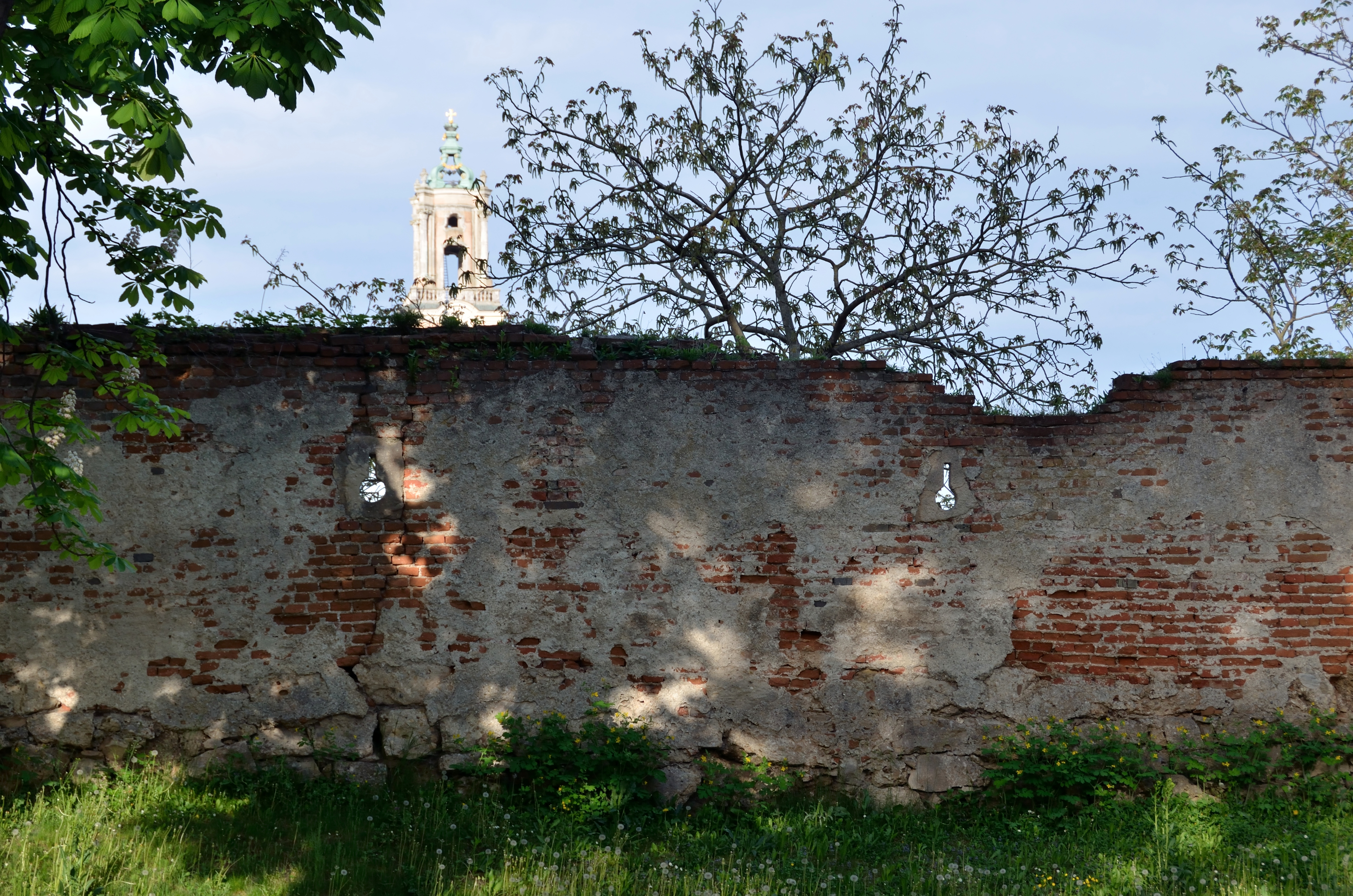
City wall Herzogenburg

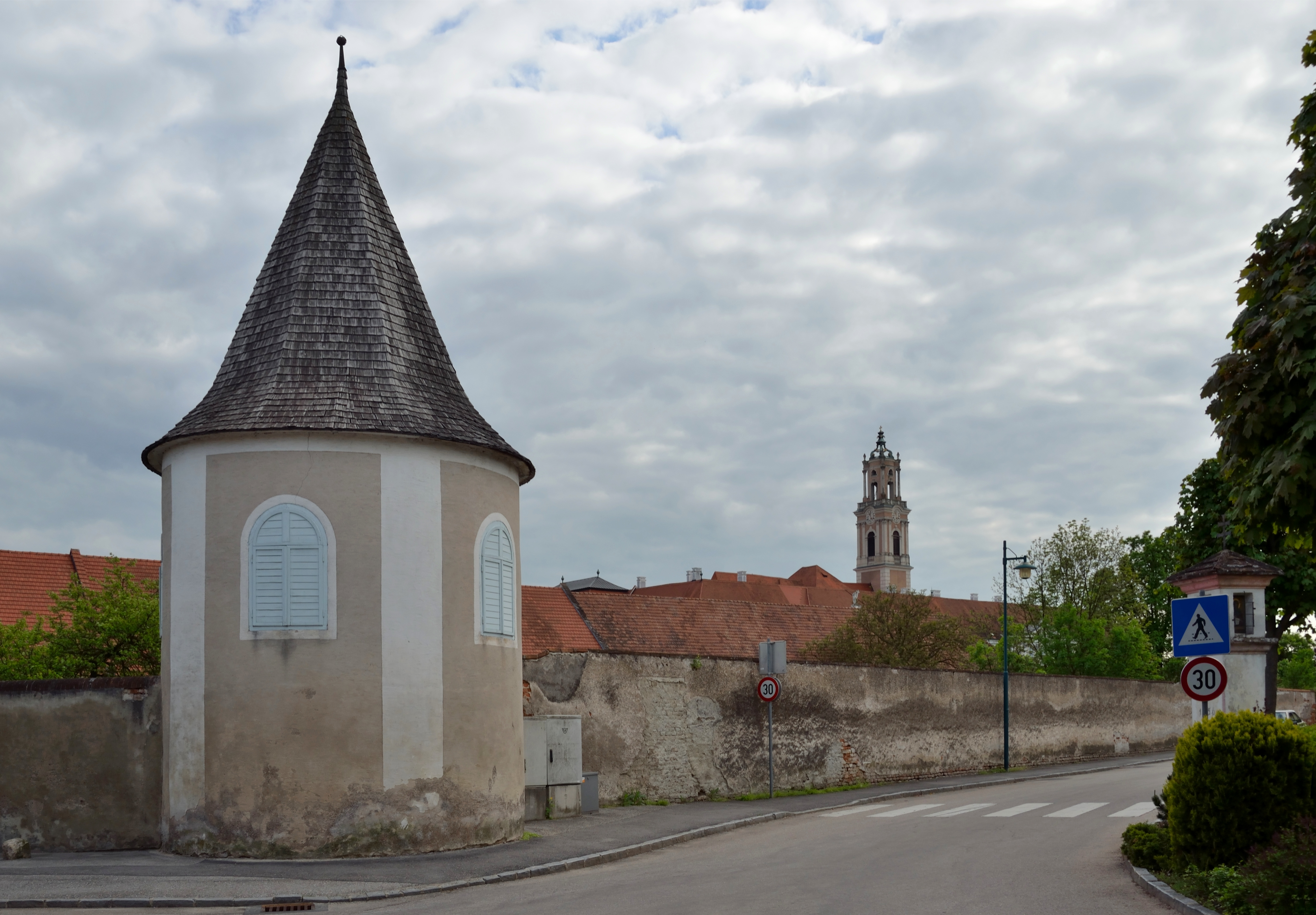
City wall Herzogenburg

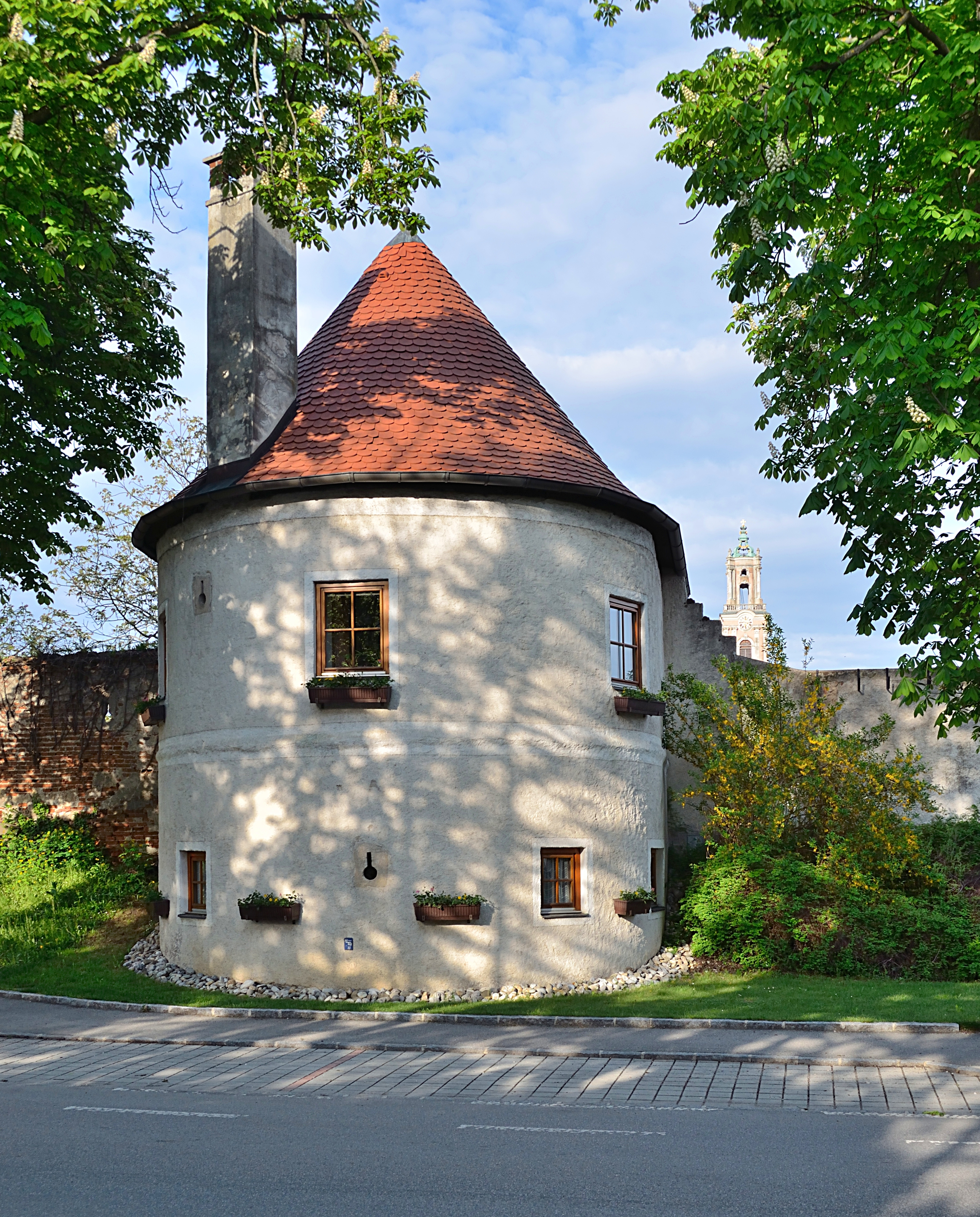
City wall Herzogenburg - Round tower Schillerring

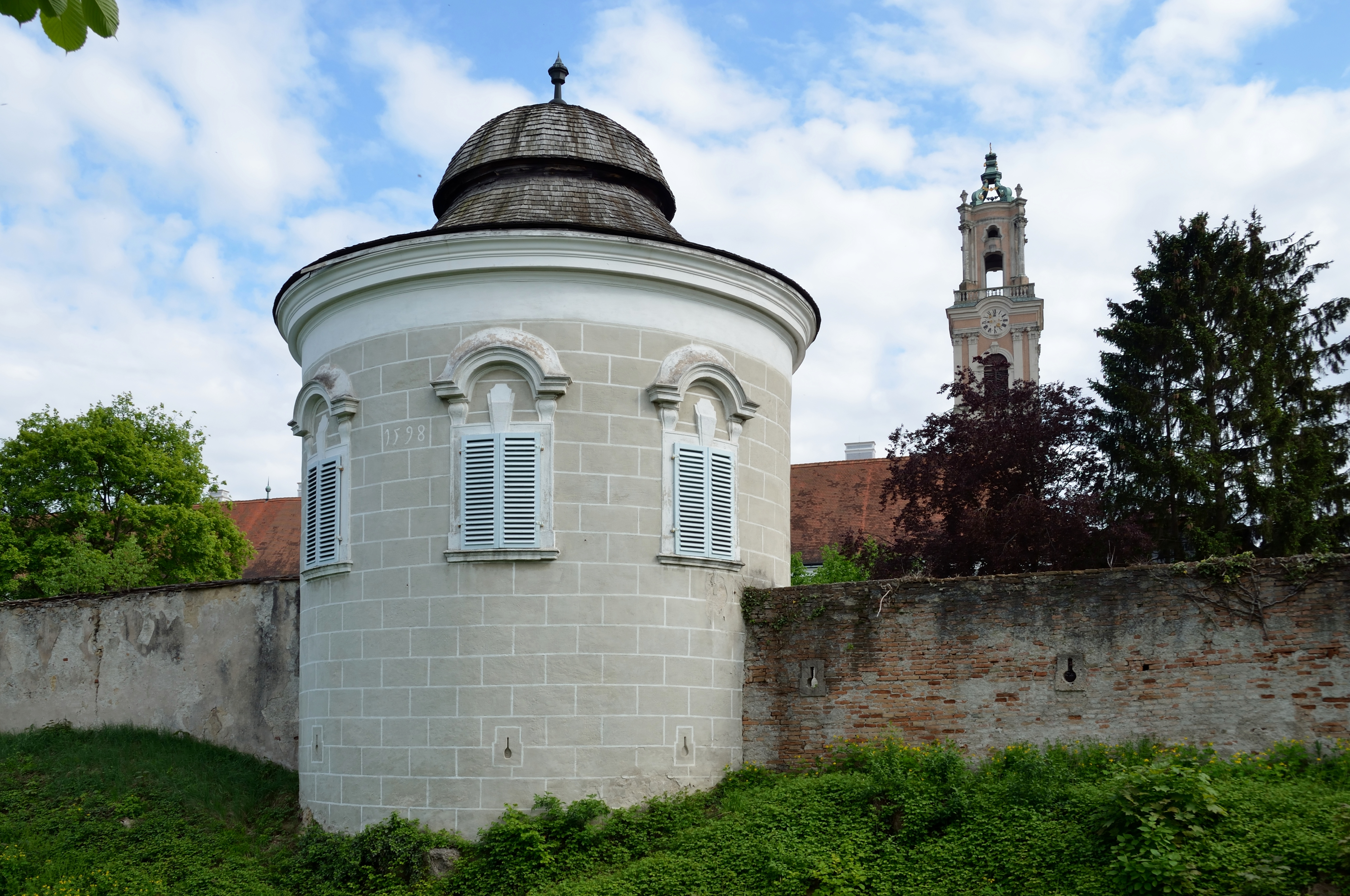
City wall Herzogenburg - round tower

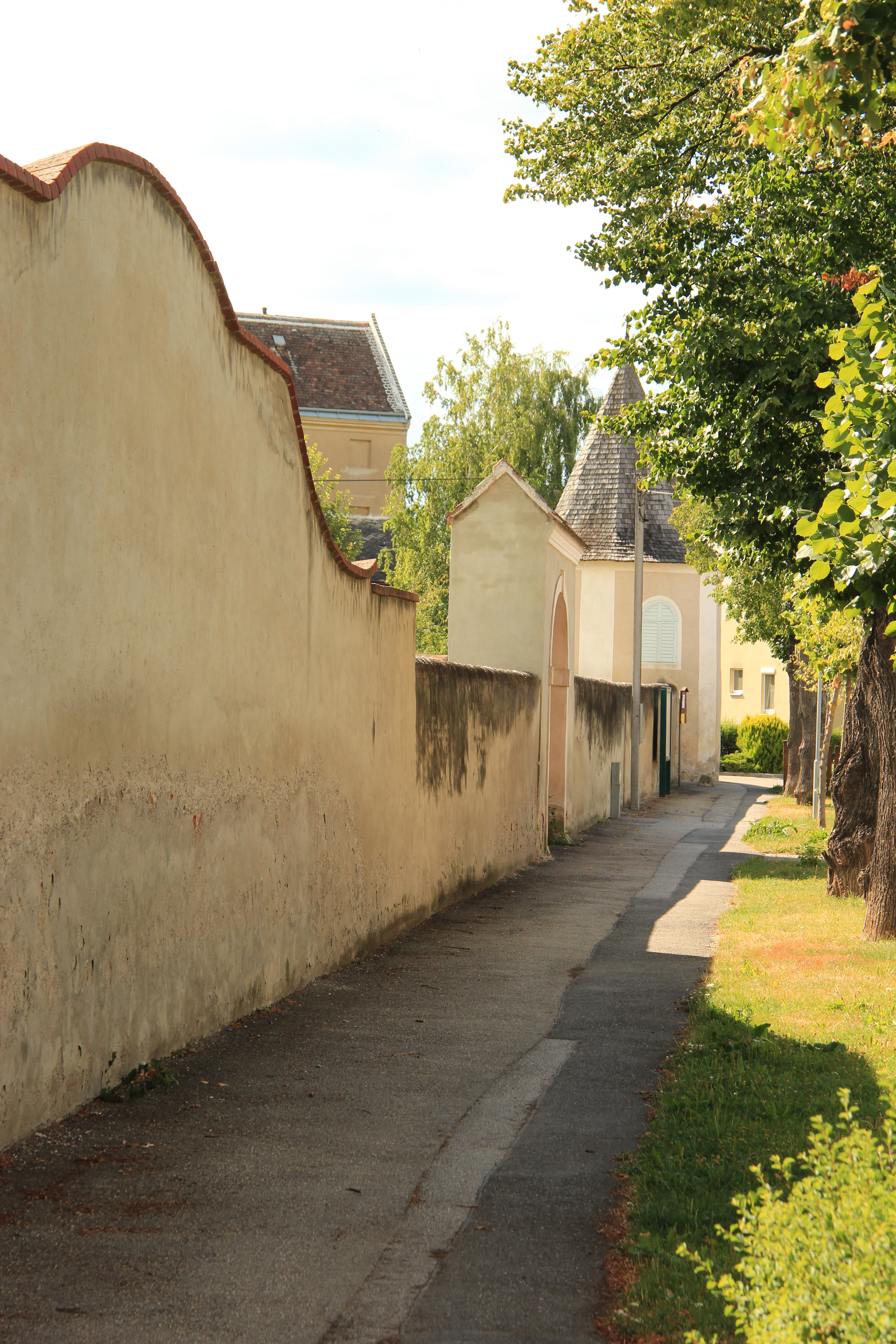
Stift Herzogenburg

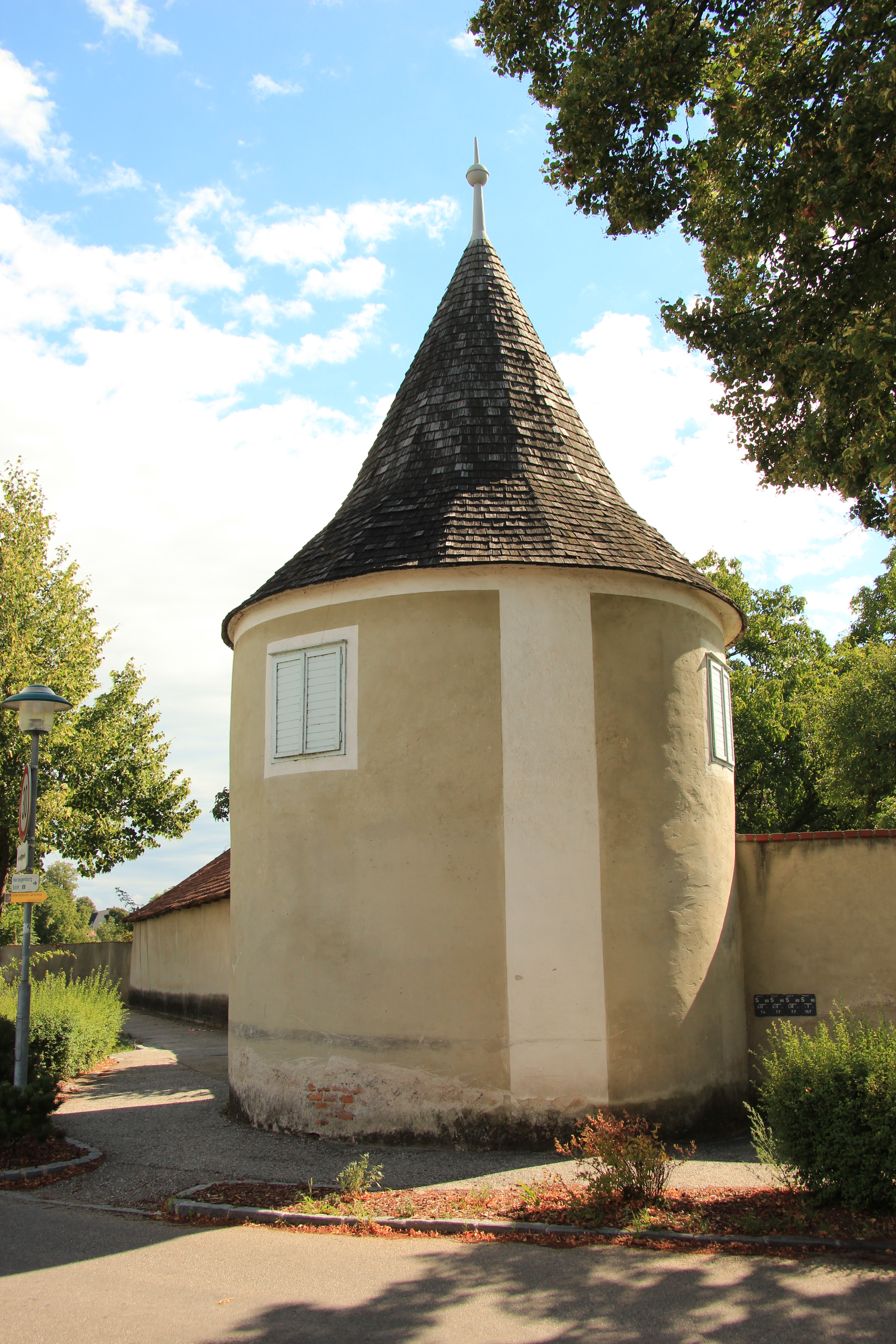
Stift Herzogenburg

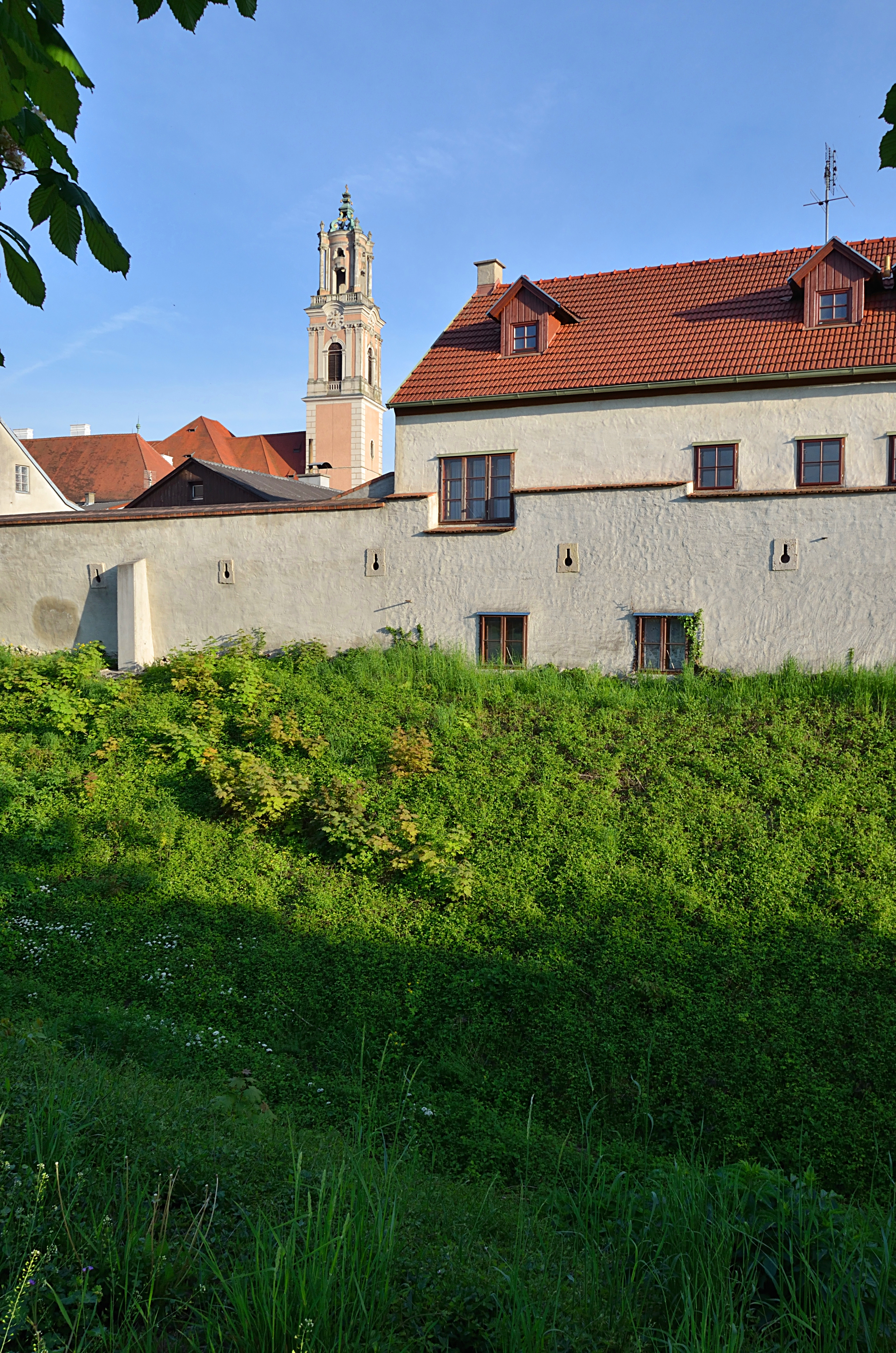
City wall Herzogenburg - moat
- Horn was originally a settlement around St Stephen's Church on the west side of the Taffa river. It was first mentioned around 1050. Between 1150 and 1160 Count Kerold laid out a new town on the east side of the Taffa and by 1282 Horn had received a charter. The town has an internal H-shaped road layout, similar to many Styrian towns, but unlike the Styrian towns in that there is a three-sided marketplace ‘Dreiecksplatz. Horn Castle, which includes a rectangular Bergfried or fortified tower, lies on the southeast of the town. No gate-towers survive and the main surviving lengths of walls are on the S, and north and west sides. On the north a long length of moat survives and from the evidence of GIS and property boundaries it appears that there was a secondary wall immediately in front of the original wall and an outer wall on the further side of the moat. There is a round tower still standing which is forward of the main wall and would have been set into the secondary wall. Merian (1649/79) shows Horn from the North and at this time there was a large ‘Teich’ or fishpond, placed there as part of the defences, in front of the moat. Also shown by Merian is a further defended area with a wall on the east side of Horn, joining the Mayerhof to a ‘Wehrkirche’ or defended church at the Ridenburg. This church has now disappeared, but a further view by Vischer in 1672, show Horn from the E, with a wall crossing the valley of the Taffa and an outer gate on the Wiener Strasse. Vischer also shows a large D-shaped bastion on the southwest of the main fortifications, which still survives. This bastion would have been used for mounting heavier artillery to cover the Taffa valley.
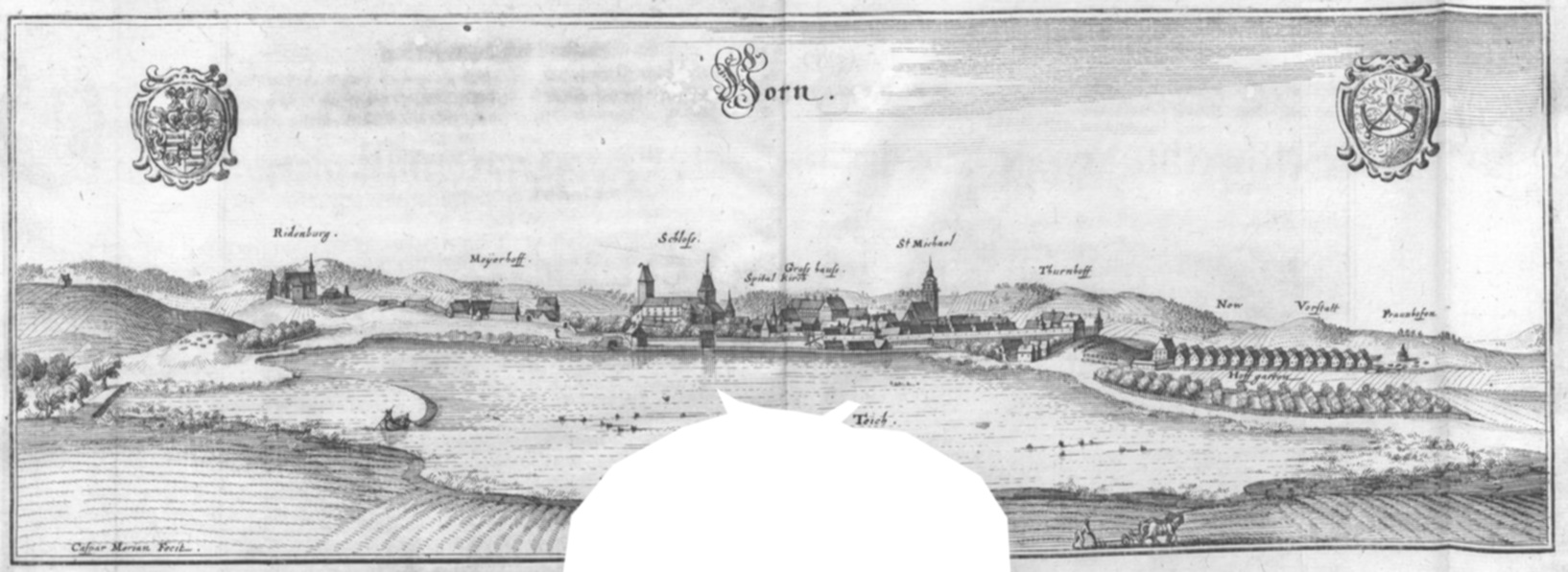
Horn (Merian)

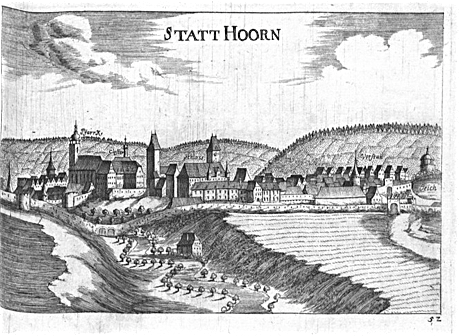
Horn, Lower Austria by Georg Mätthaus Vischer 1672.

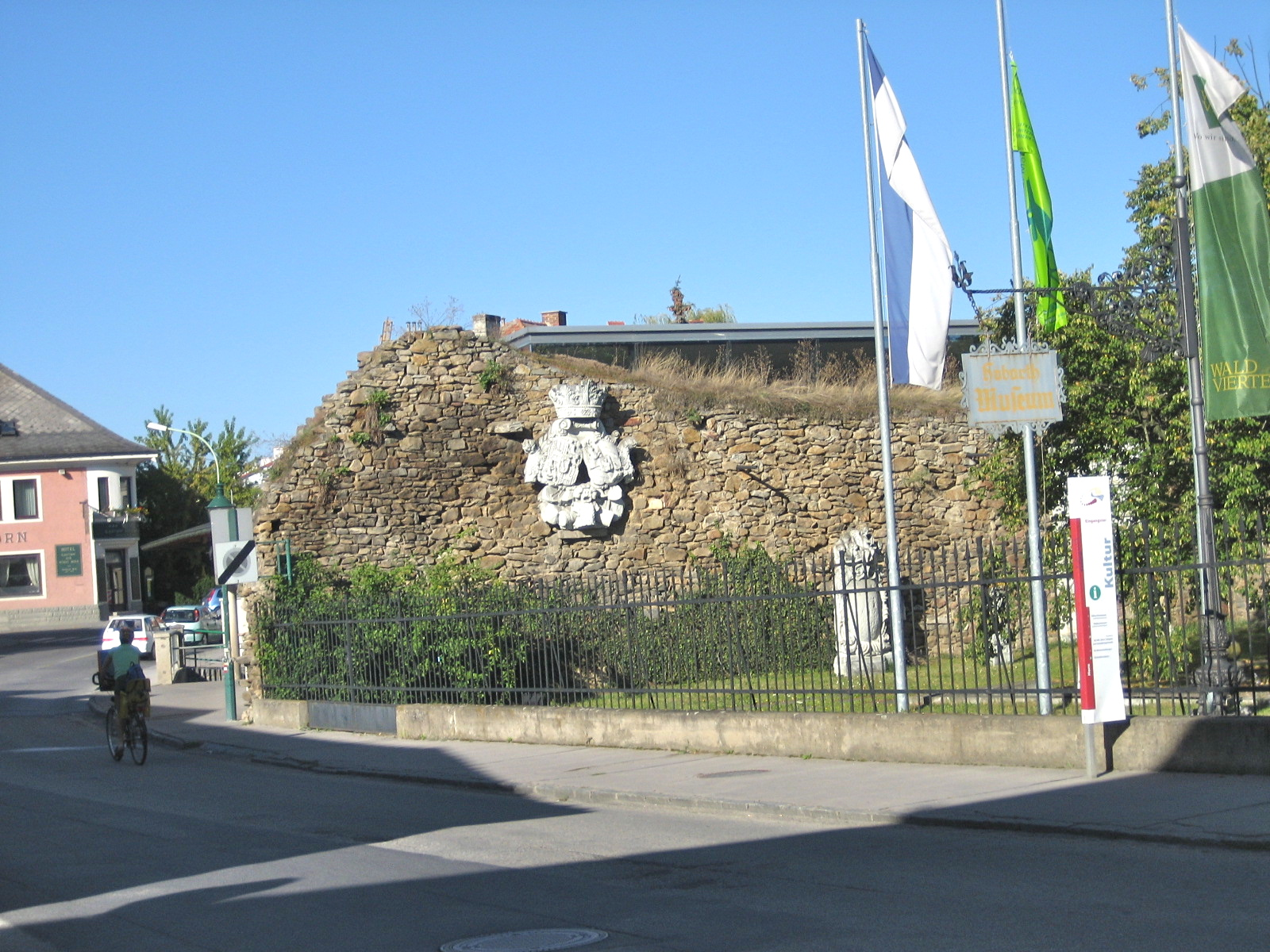
The Town Wall at Horn by the Graselturm

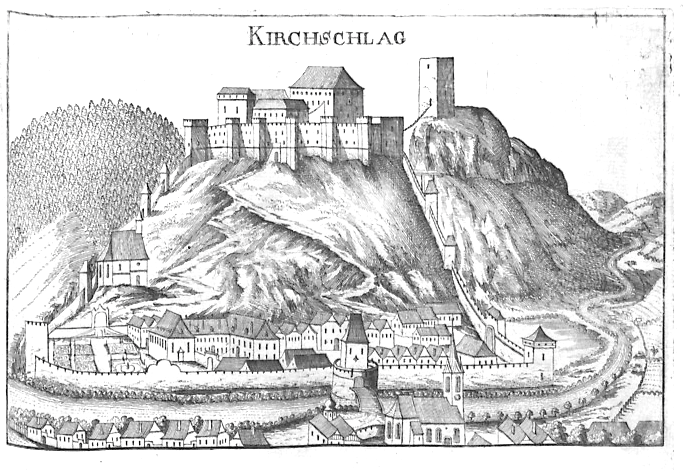
Kirchschlag, Lower Austria by Vischer in 1672

- Kirchschlag in der Buckligen Welt. Defences erected by the Kuenringer in 1240. Market made in 1454. The town lies on the old border between Austria and Hungary.
- Klosterneuburg. Originally a rectangular Roman auxiliary fort site placed on a prominent bluff overlooking the Danube. This fort may have continued as a defensive work and settlement until Margraf Leopold III decided to move his main residence here in 1113. In 1133, he founded the Augustinian Abbey, which now lies over the site of the fort and dominates the city. The Bohemian King Ottokar II appears to have laid out a new town to the south and southeast of the Abbey around 1250 and a Market charter was granted in 1256. This was the Oberstadt. Below this to the west the Church of St Martin had been founded around 1050. Archduke Albrect II then laid out a second town, the ‘Unterstadt’ that was walled, using St Martins as the parish church. In 1298 both towns were granted a joint charter. There is little evidence for the once extensive fortifications, but these can be reconstructed from the Vischer print of 1672 and the Merian print of 1649/79. The Vischer print looks from the town showing the wall of the ‘Unterstadt’ facing the Danube with a gate tower. The west wall of the Oberstadt is shown prominently, also with a gate-tower and there is also evidence for the massive 16th century trace bastion, presumably designed by an Italian military architect to the northwest of the Monastery. The Merian view is taken from the east looking west and shows corner towers and the east gate -tower to the Oberstadt and a rectangular tower or gate-tower on the S. All this evidence for the fortification has now largely disappeared but the NÖ GIS information with property boundaries shows evidence for a moat at the southwest corner of the Oberstadt and the position of the trace bastion at the northwest adjacent to the old course of the Danube.
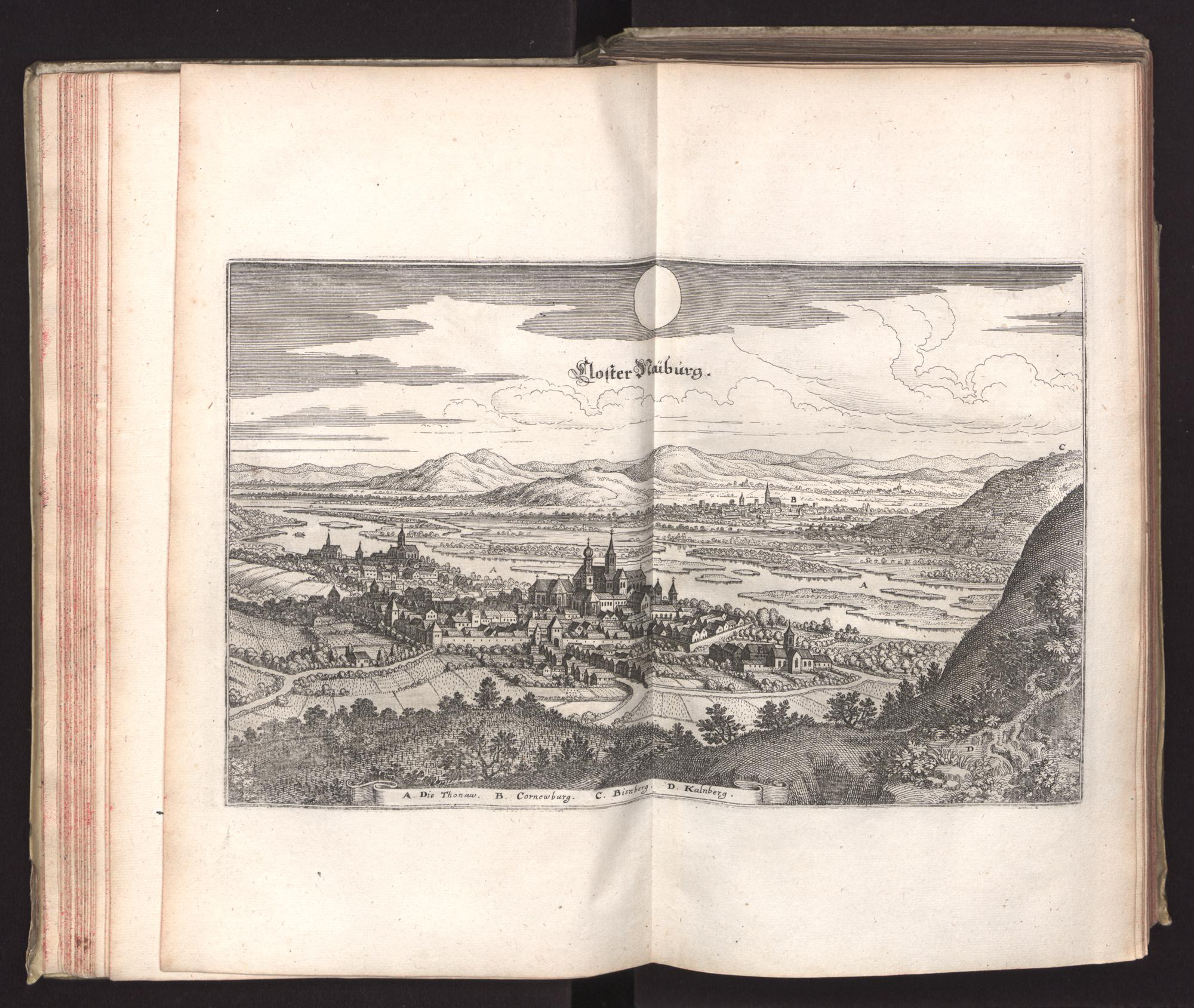
Topographia Austriacarum (Merian)

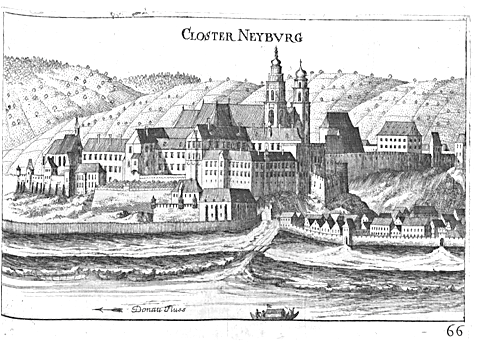
Klosterneuburg Lower Austria by Georg Mätthaus in 1672

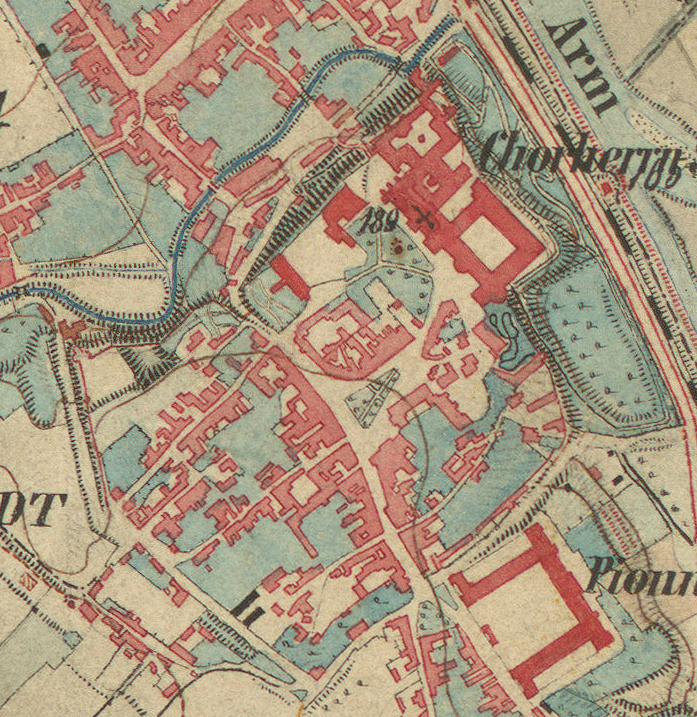
Klosterneuburg. Franziszeische Landesaufnahme 2nd Military Survey c. 1835

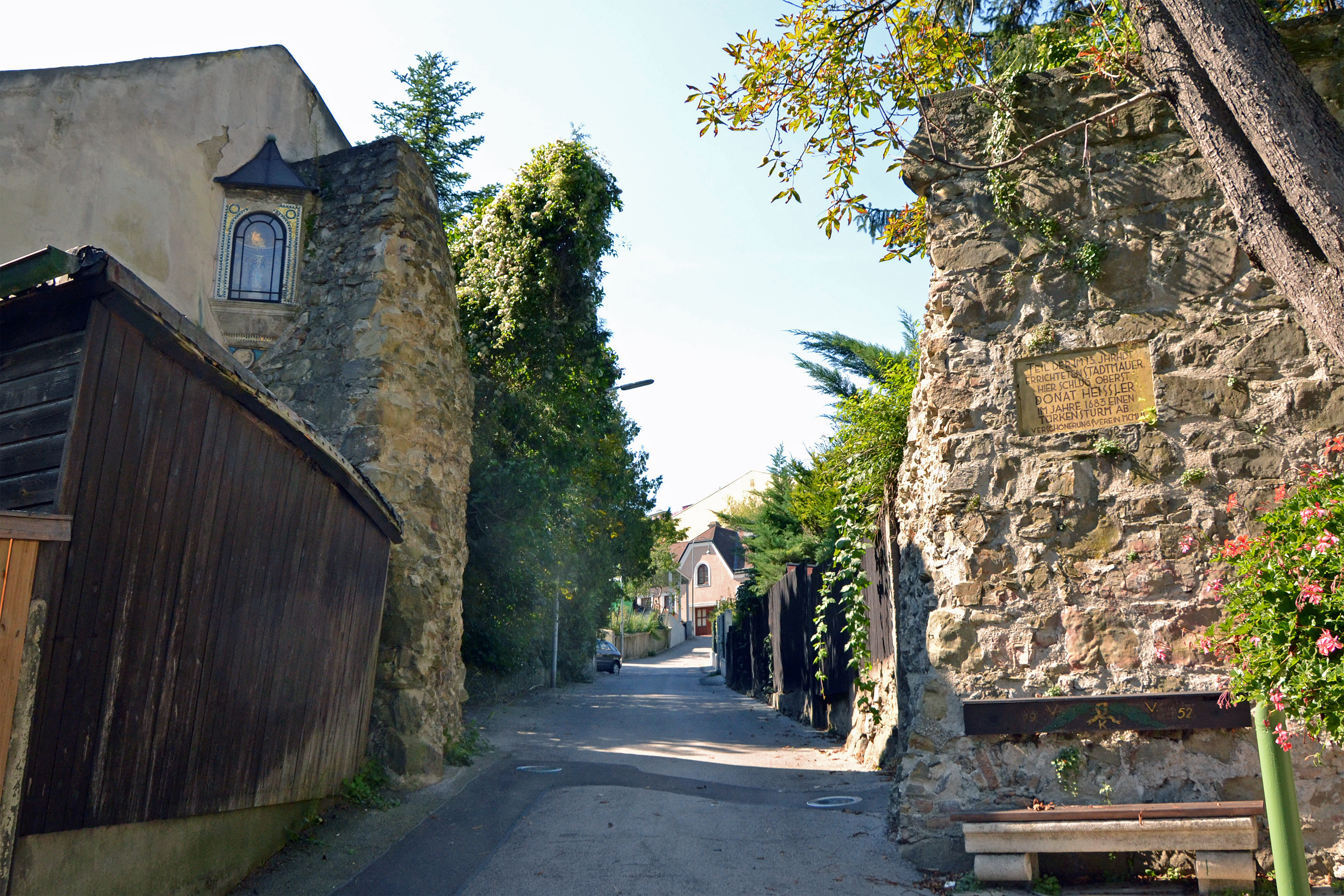
Stadtmauer Klosterneuburg Pater Abel-Straße

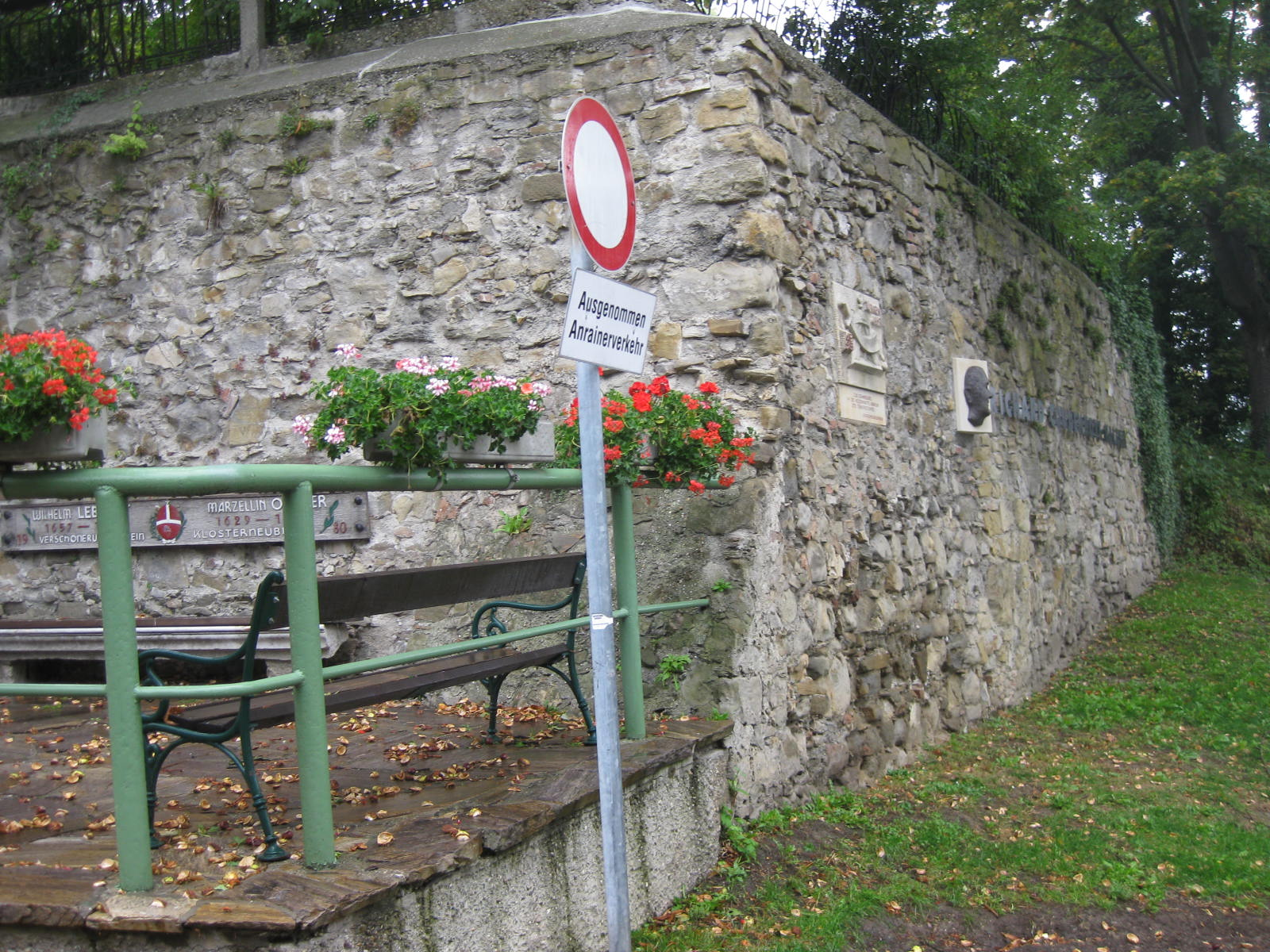
Stadtmauer Klosterneuburg
- Korneuburg has an almost ovoid layout. The large rectangular grid plan layout with a large square in the centre has been compared with Silesian town layouts and presumably represents a re-design of the internal layout at the start of the 14th century, within the older town defences. Typical of this Silesian layout is the Market Square with the ‘Ringplatz’, with an isolated ‘Rathhaus’ or Town Hall in the centre, which was surrounded by the market. Originally Klosterneuburg and Kornueburg were administered together as ‘Nivenburg’. Kornueberg had market rights by 1114 and was granted a charter in 1298 by Duke Albrecht I, which led to the formal separation of Kornueburg from Klosterneuburg. in 1298 by Duke AlbrechtI I. Also by this charter the town was to have ‘landesfürstliche Festung’, implying that the emperor rather than the citizens were responsible for the maintenance of the wall. The main information for the defences comes from the plan of the defences published by Merian about 1650. This shows a double wall, and beyond this a water-filled moat circling the town. At various strategic points there were ravelins, which were moated. Three gates, the Kloster Tor, the Viener Tor and the Schiff Tor, each had a circular moated barbican in front of them, presumably with a drawbridge. The Schiff Tor, which survived into the late 19th century, would have been a Watergate, leading to the Danube, before the river moved its course. The other gates have disappeared, and the moat filled by a road that circles the inner town, The inner and outer wall are clearly discernable in modern property boundaries, as is a ravelin to the south of the site of the Schiff Tor. Some substantial lengths of wall survive in the northeast of the circuit.
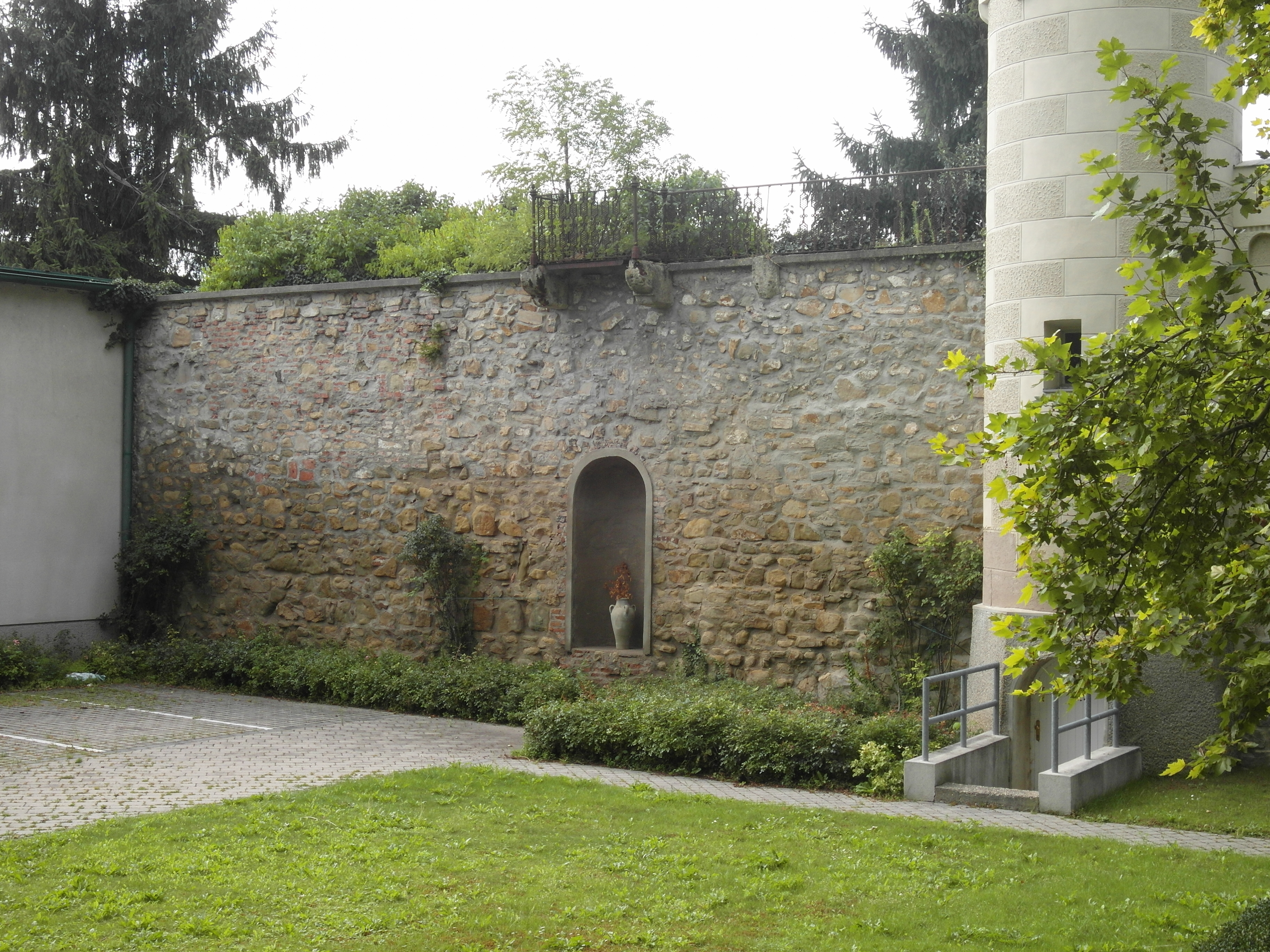
Korneuburg-Stadtmauerabschnitt Wiener Ring

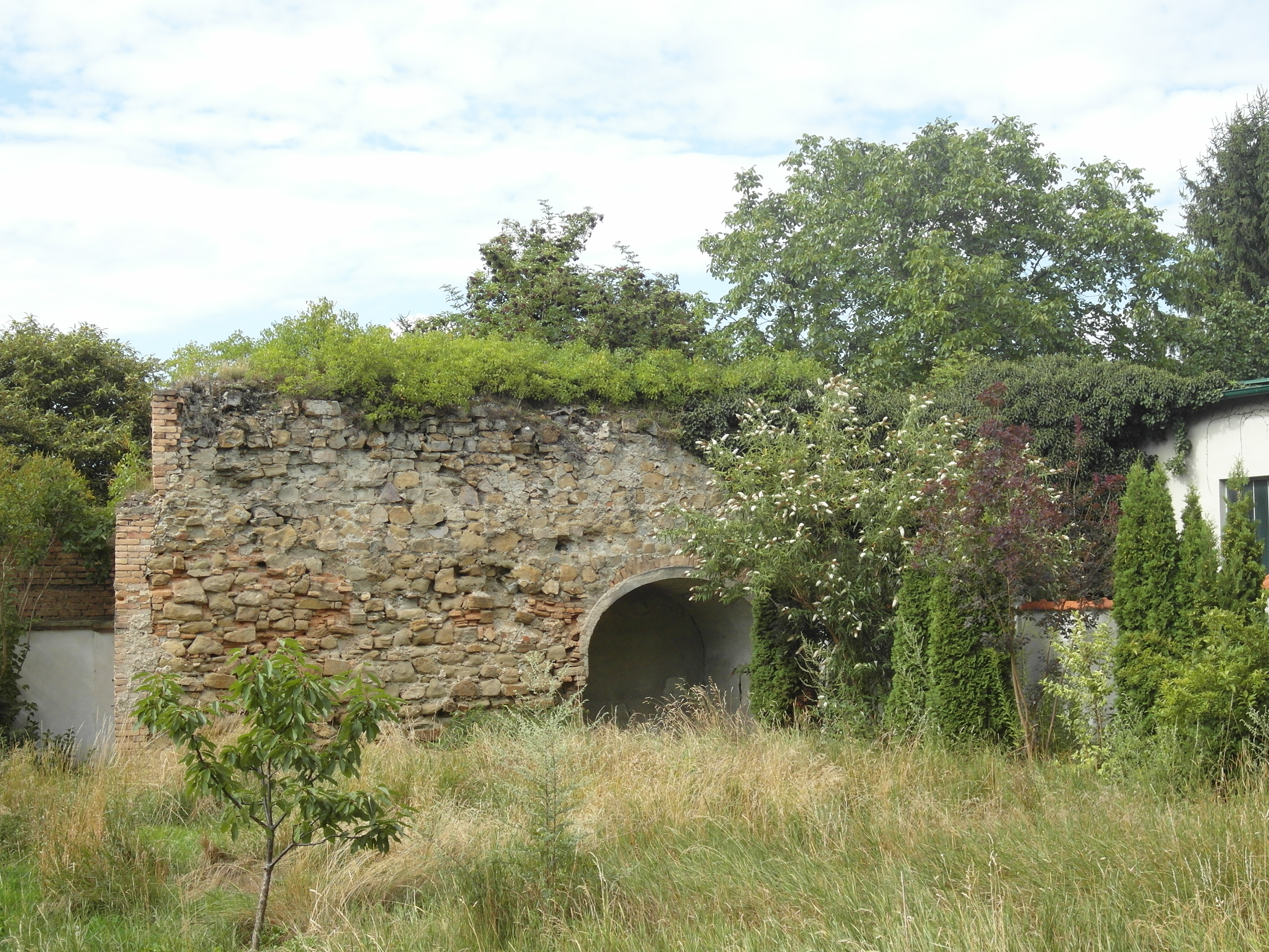
Korneuburg-Stadtmauerabschnitt

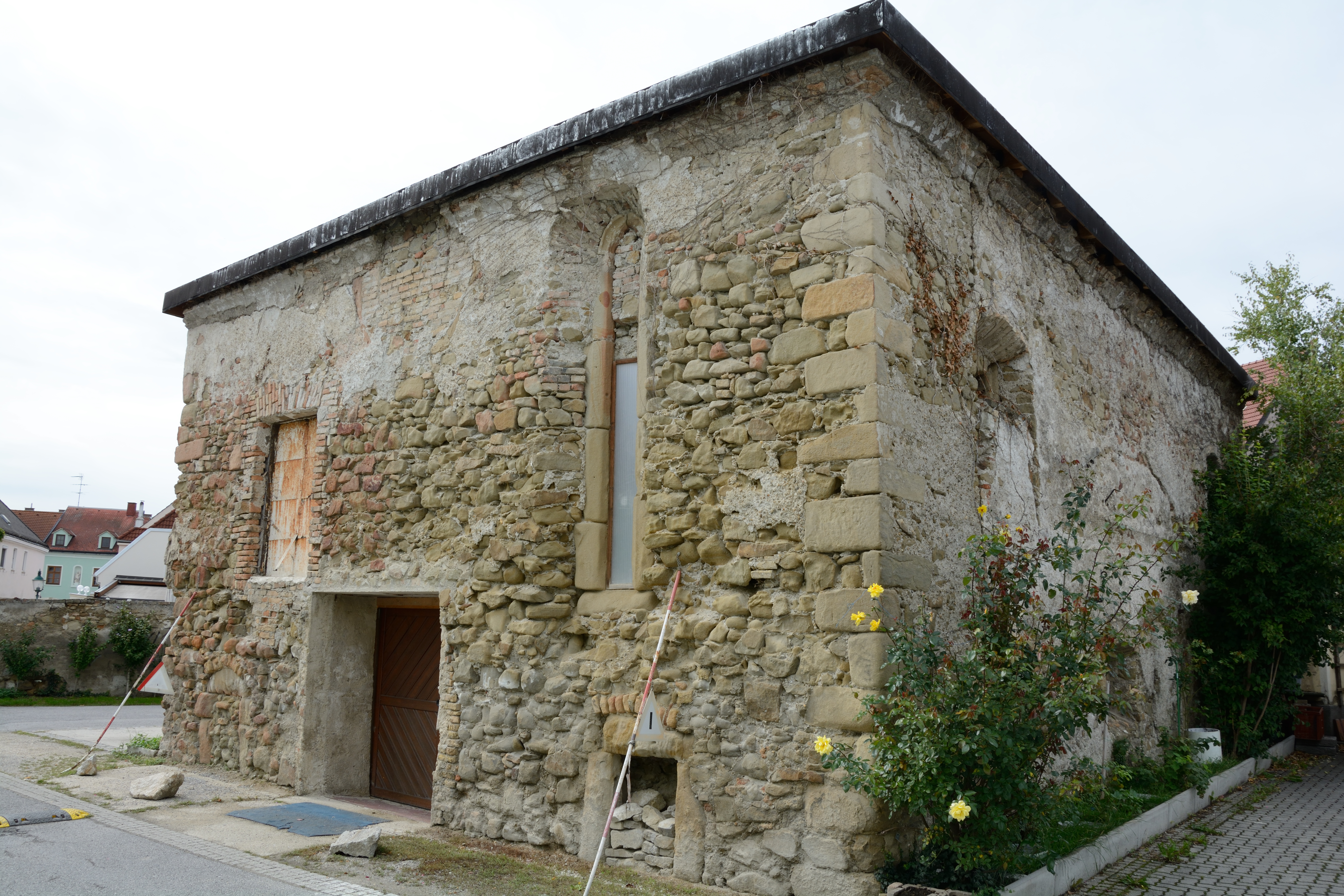
Former Synagoge ? Wall tower

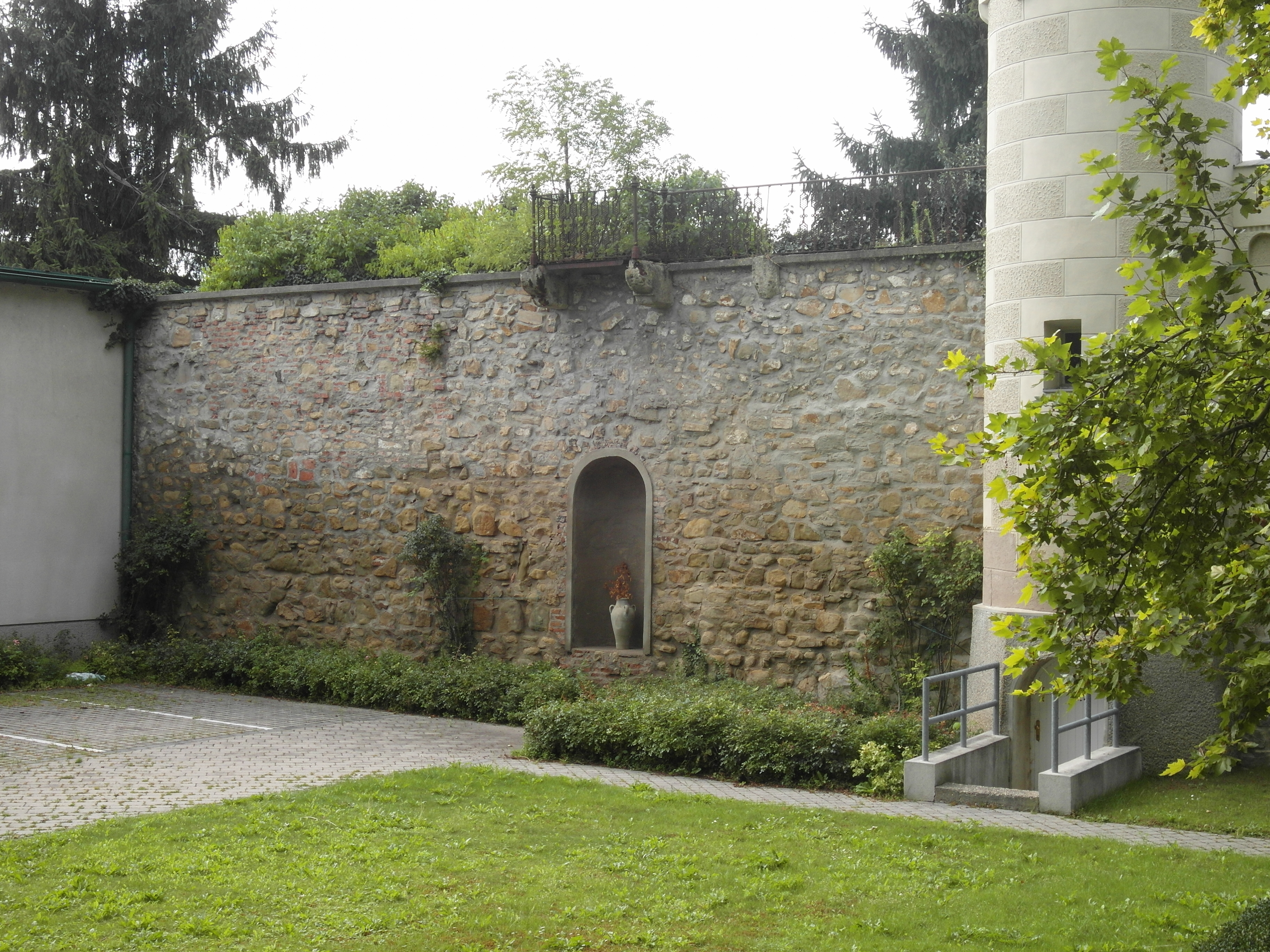
Korneuburg-Walls WienerRing

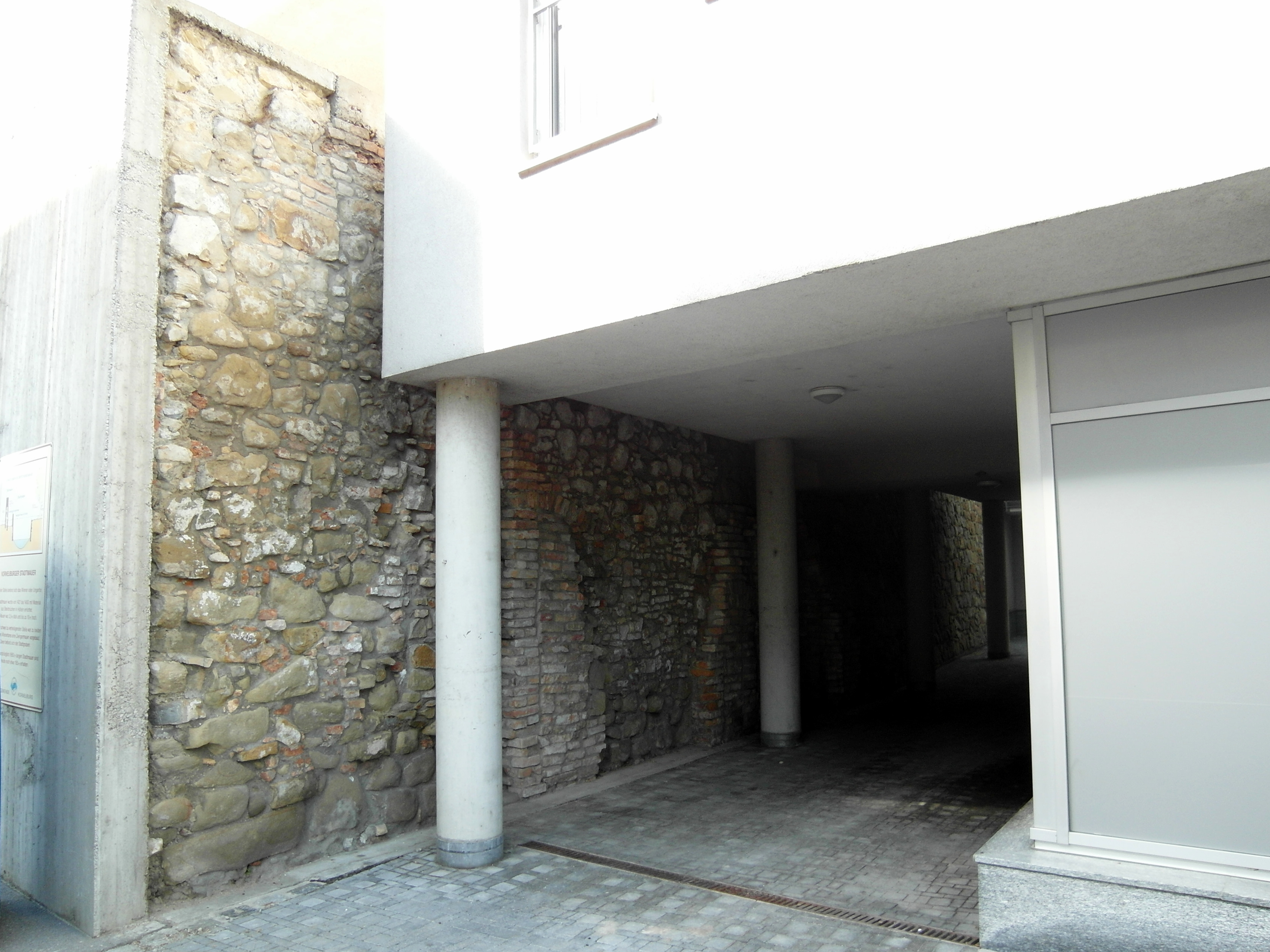
Korneuburg-WienerStraßeStadtbefestigung
- Krems is first mentioned in 995 AD, which indicates that it had become part of the German, or more specifically Bavarian settlement of the area. The name Krems implies that it was Slavic and may have been on the frontier of the Greater Moravian Empire, which occupied much of the territory of Lower Austria to the north of the Danube prior to 907 AD. Furthermore, the plan of the medieval walled town suggests an ovoid layout with a citadel on the north side, typical of a Phase 2 Slavic settlements dating from the start of the 9th century. The Merian print of 1679 shows the town walls facing the Danube had a secondary wall and a number of round towers. Merian also provides a complete plan of the defences to illustrate the siege of Krems by the Swedes in 1646. There were ravelins between the walls and the Danube probably constructed by an Italian military engineer, in the 1550s. Today the impressive barbican Steiner Tor forms the west gateway, further walls and the Pulverturm of 1477, survive on the north and east, together with fragments of wall and a tower adjacent to the Muhlgasse on the S
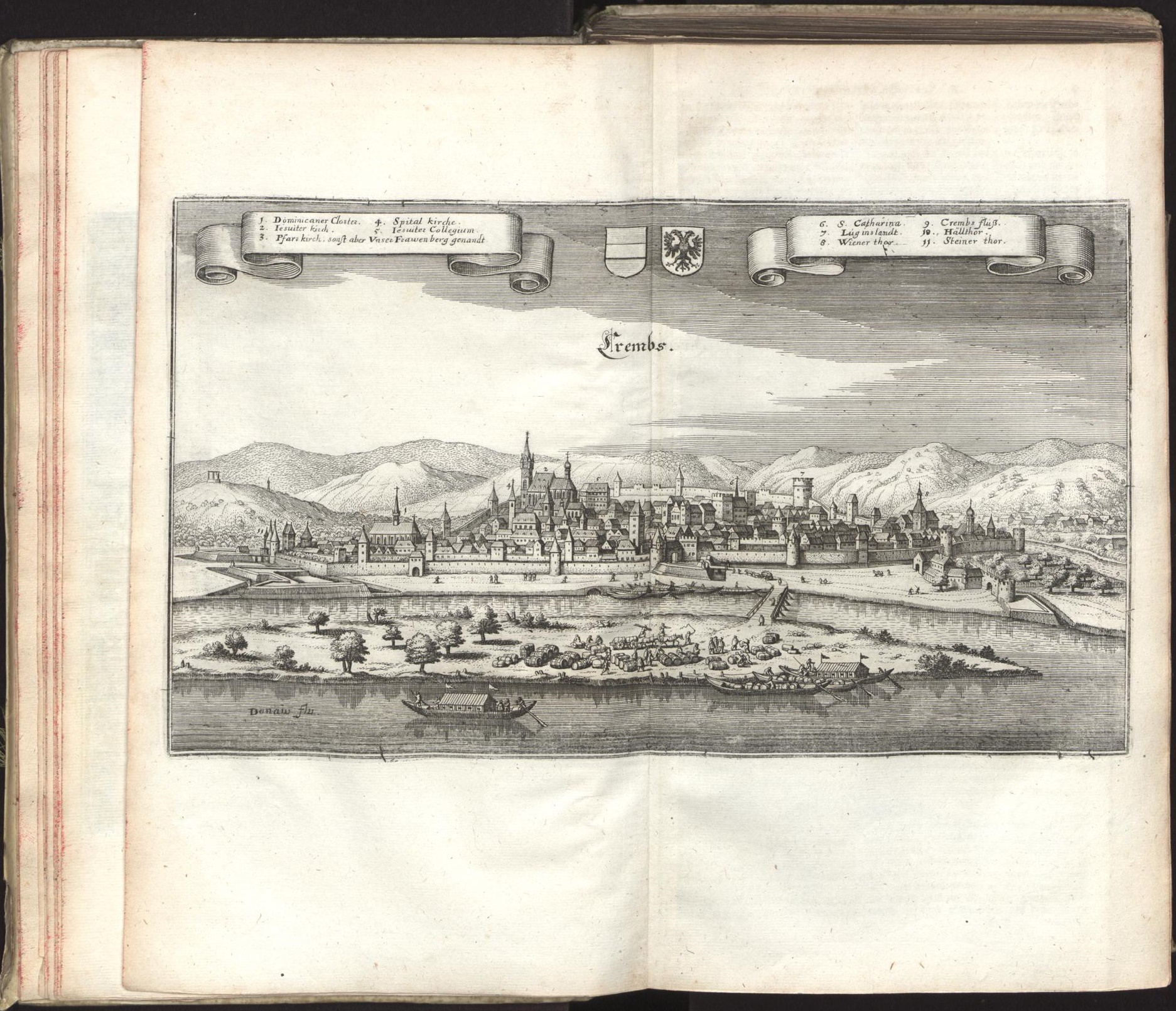
Topographia Austriacarum (Merian)

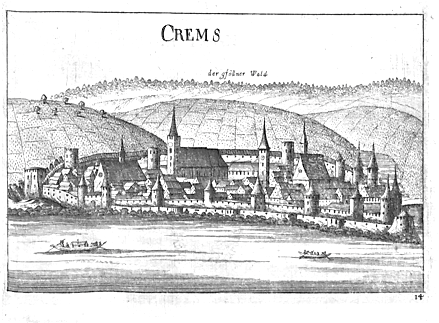
Krems an der Donau, Lower Austria by Georg Mätthaus Vischer in 1672

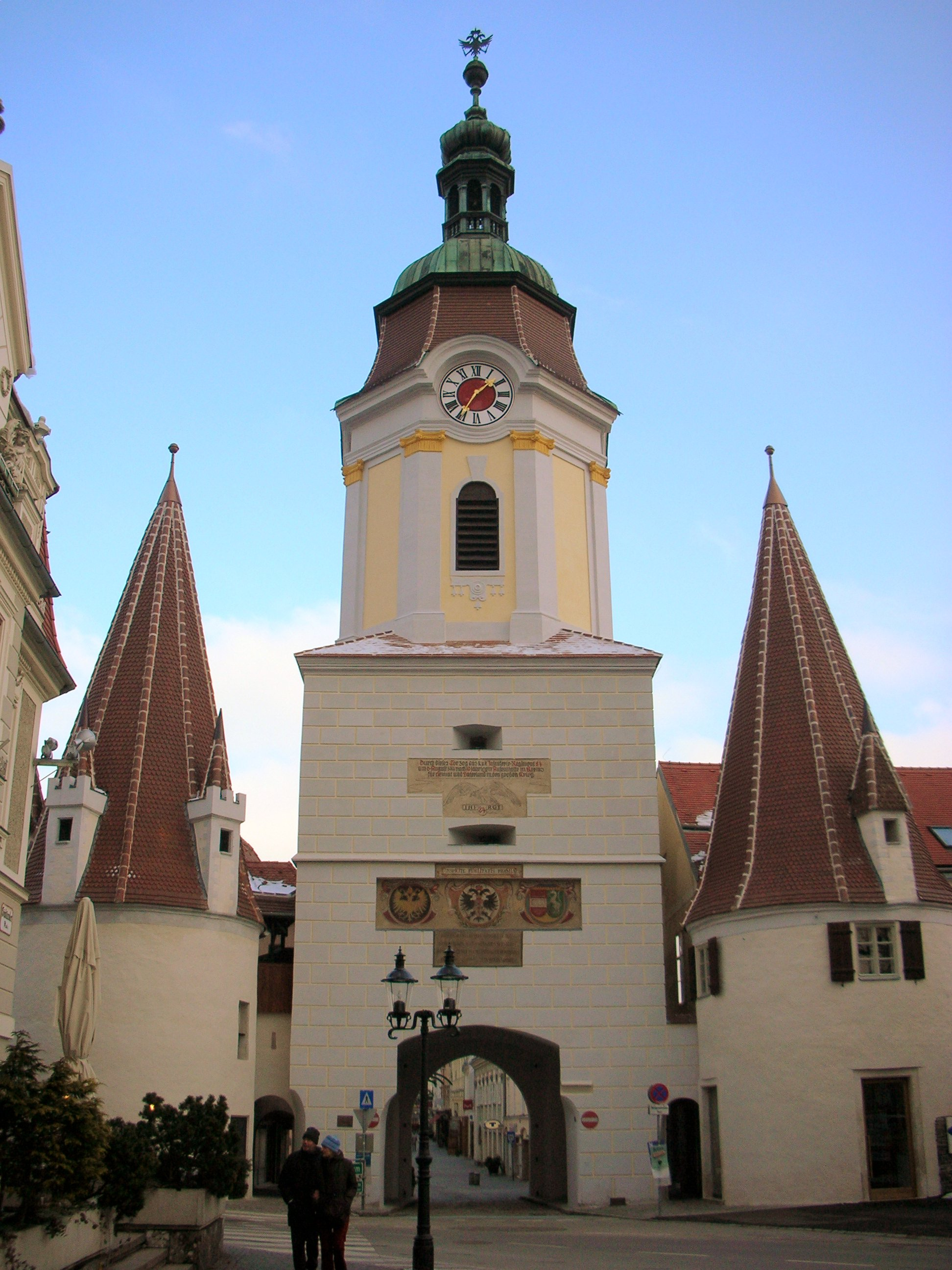
The Steiner Tor

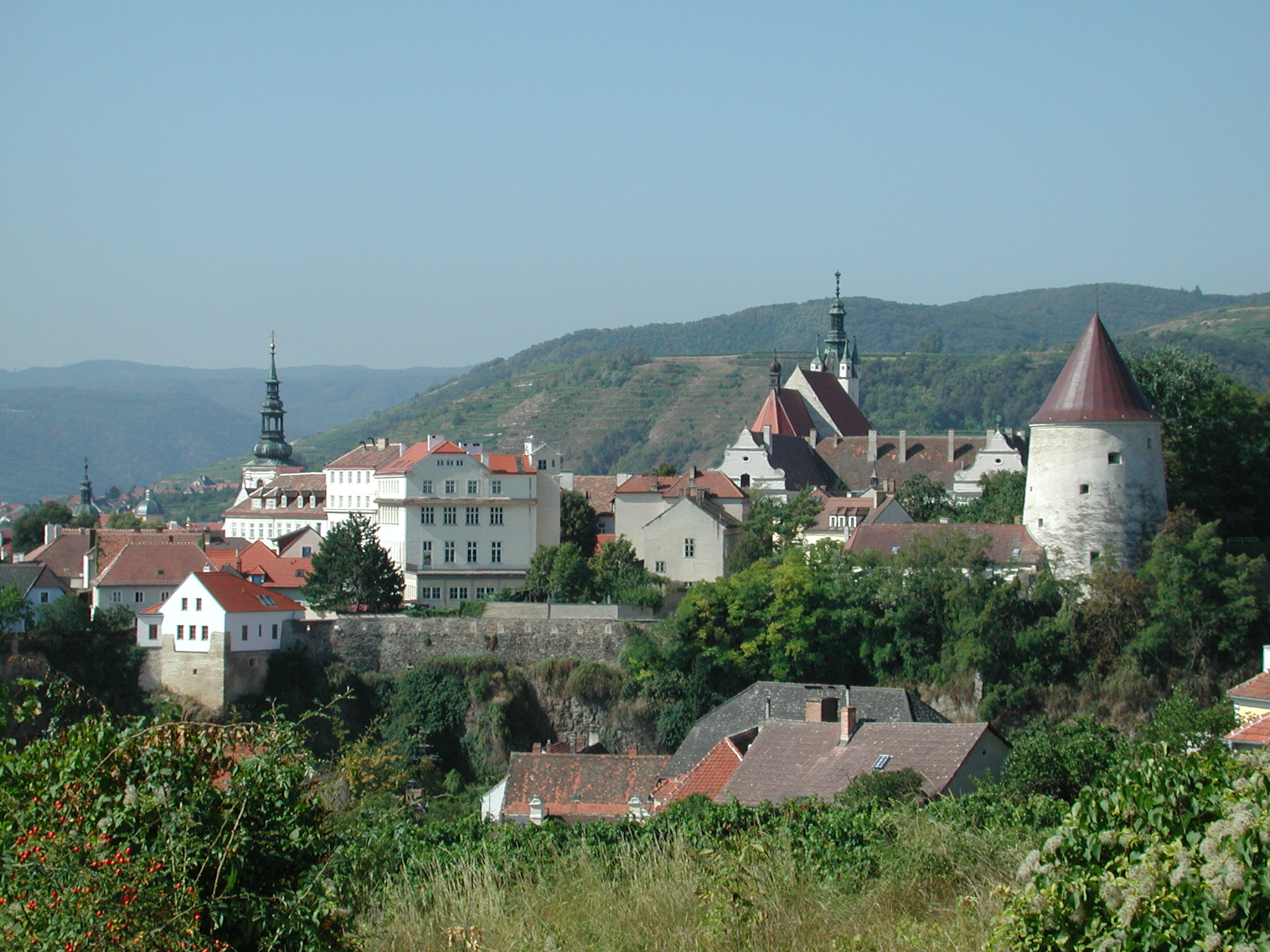
Blick auf die Altstadt von Krems. Shows the Pulverturm and a length of wall with gun slots

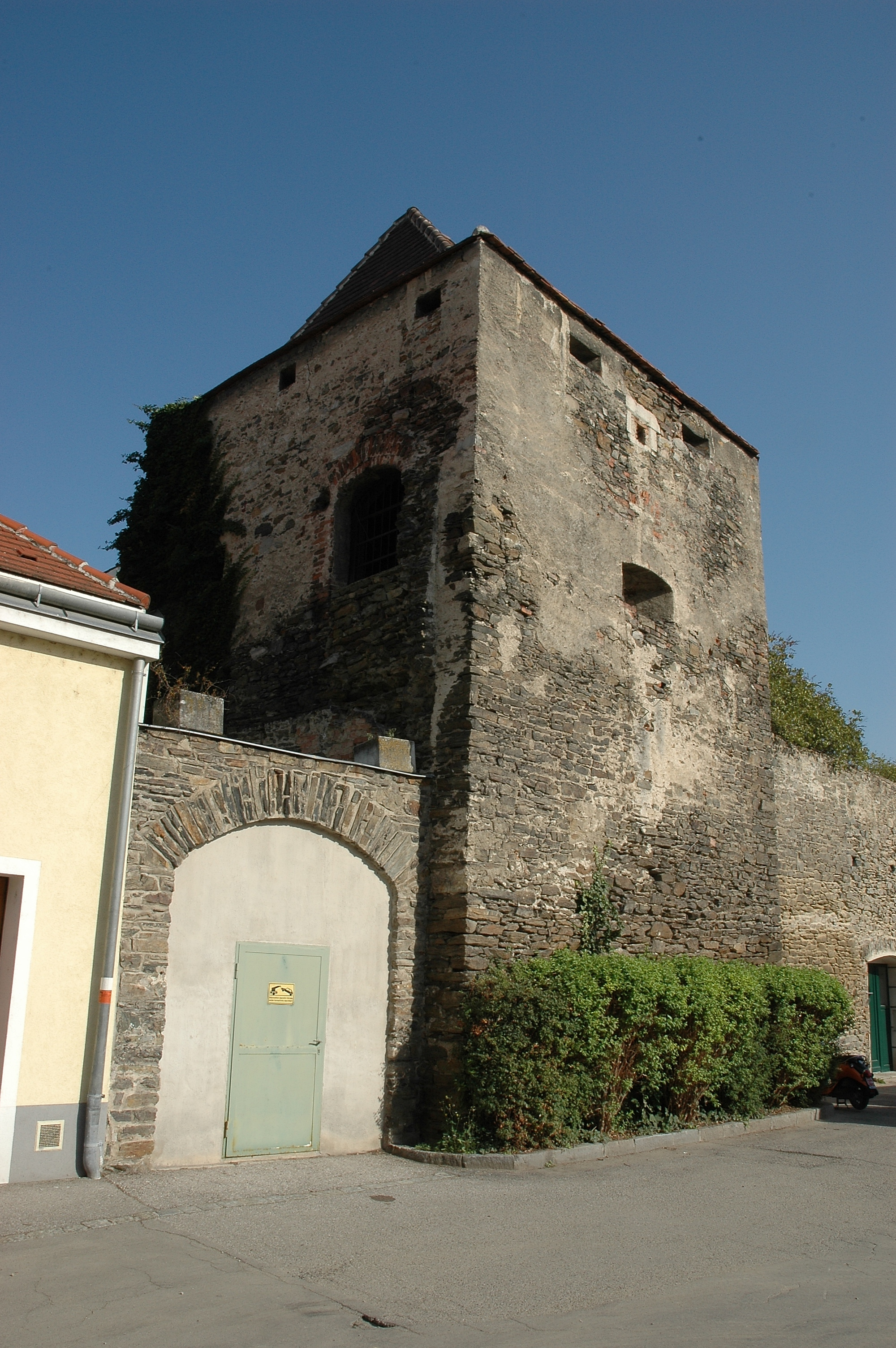
Mühlbachgasse Stadtturm. On N side of Krems. Note gun ports

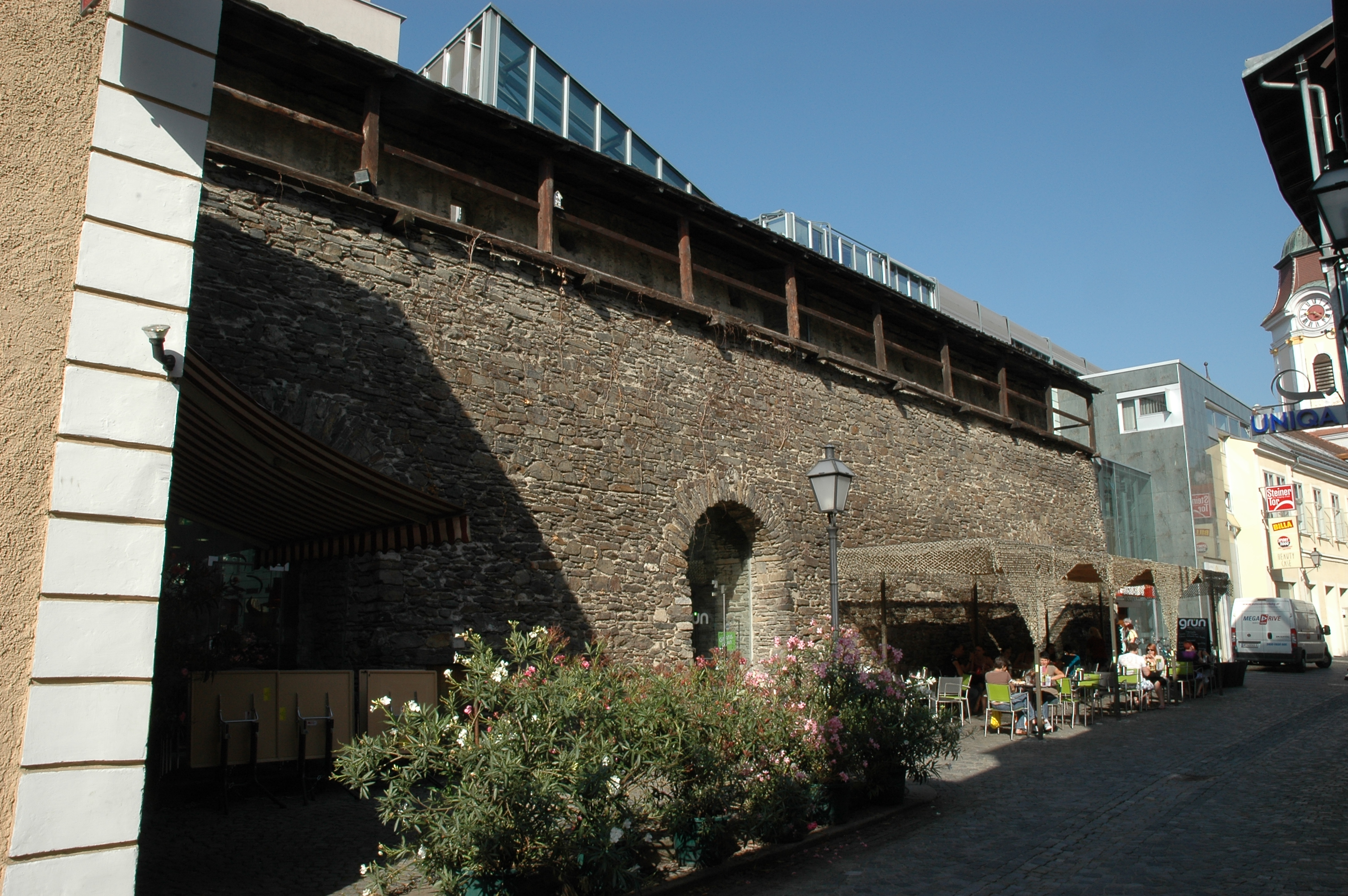
Stadtmauer Krems bei Steinertor, S of the Steiner Tor- re-constructed wooden walkway of 1941

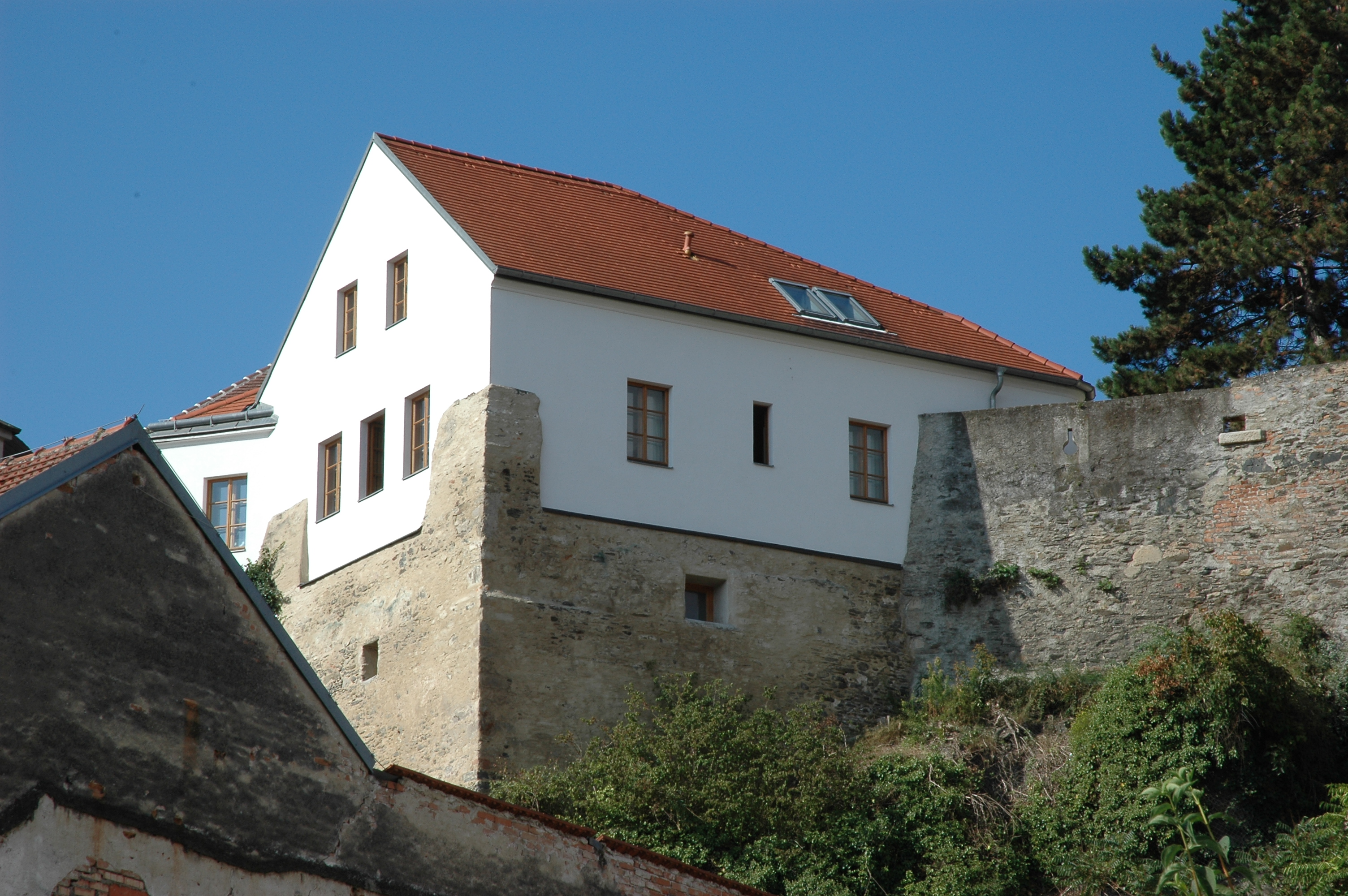
Wallgasse

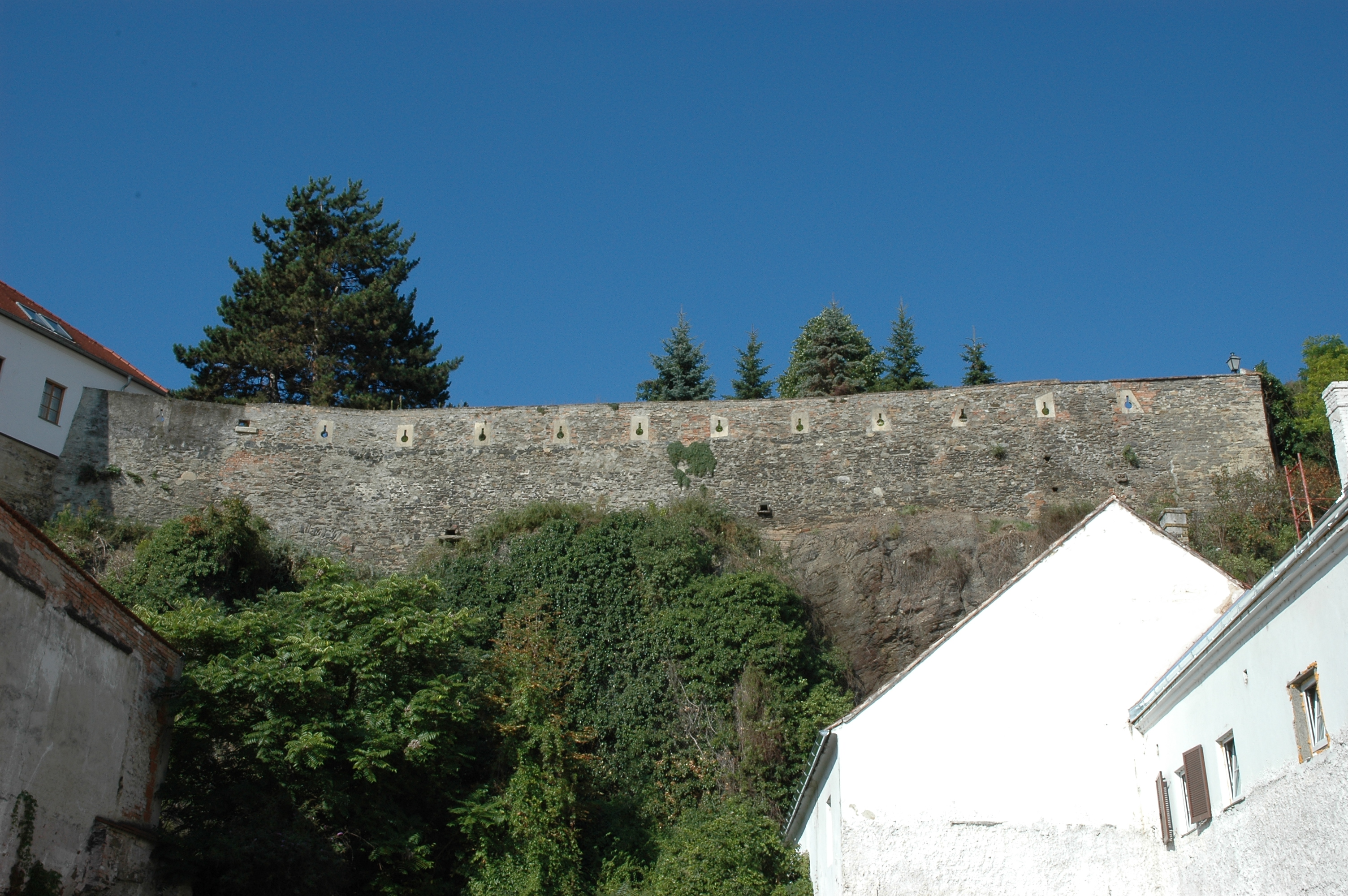
Wallgasse Stadtmauer. Equally spaced ‘keyhole’ gun ports on the wall at Lederergasse, Krems

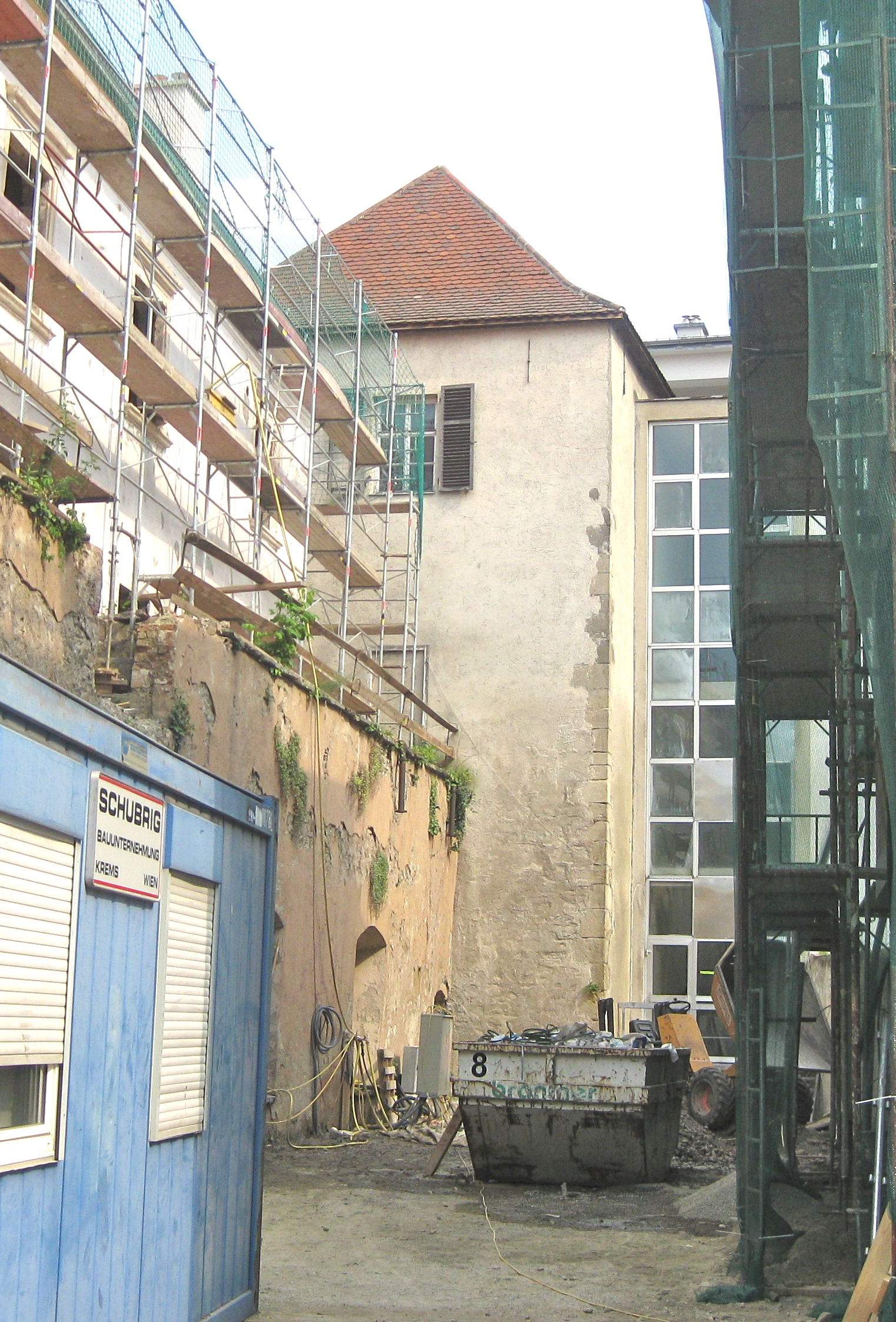
Krems. Wall tower S of Steinertor

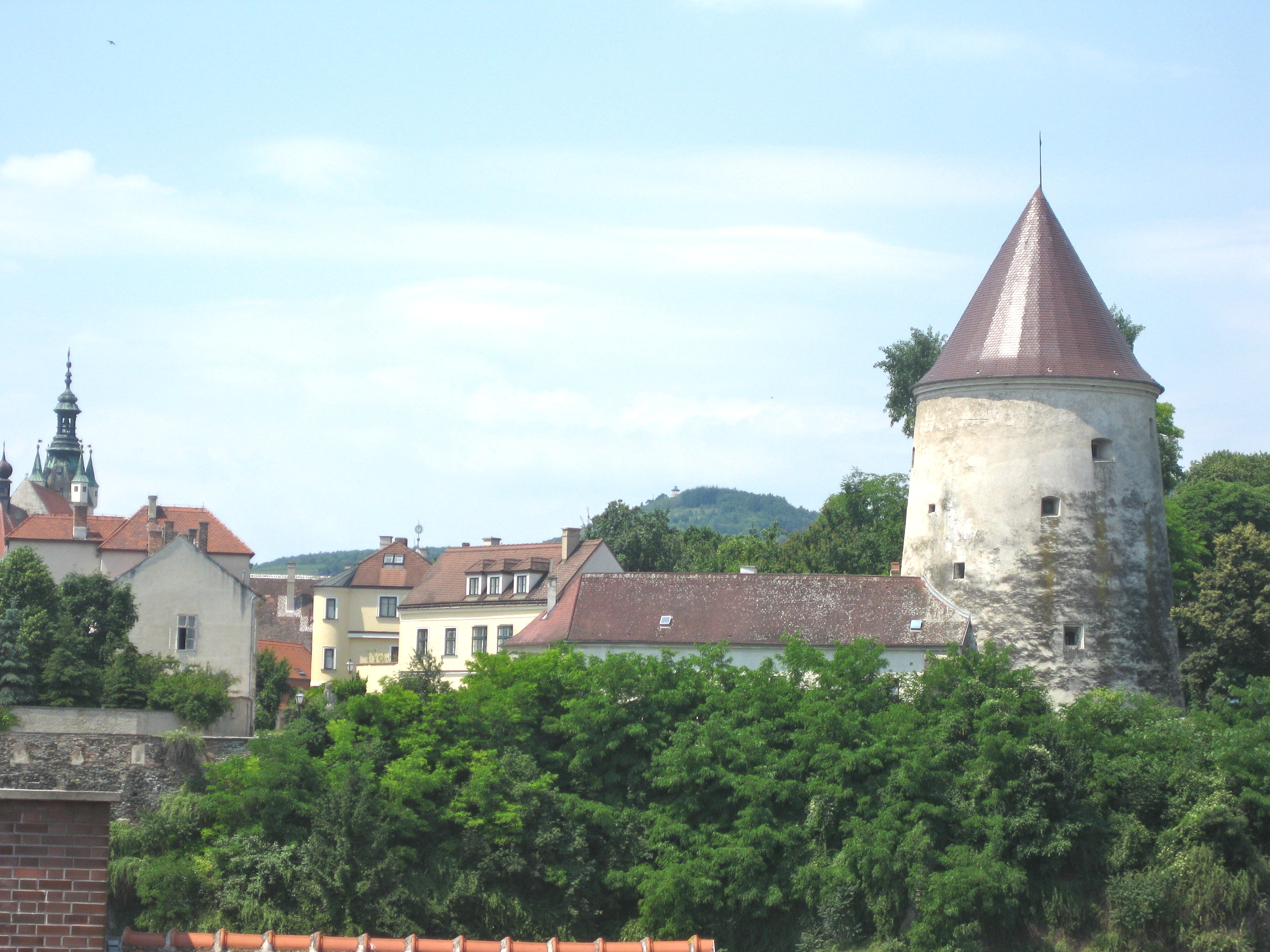
Krems Pulverturm.
- Laa an der Thaya was first mentioned around 1150. This is presumably a reference to the Altstadt, which is the north of the planned town. The town was laid out in a rectangular plan by Duke Leopold VI and granted a charter in 1230
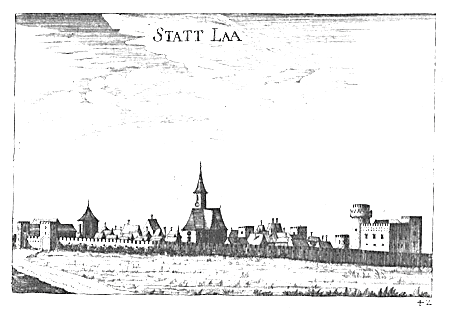
Laa an der Thaya, Lower Austria by Georg Mätthaus Vischer in 1672

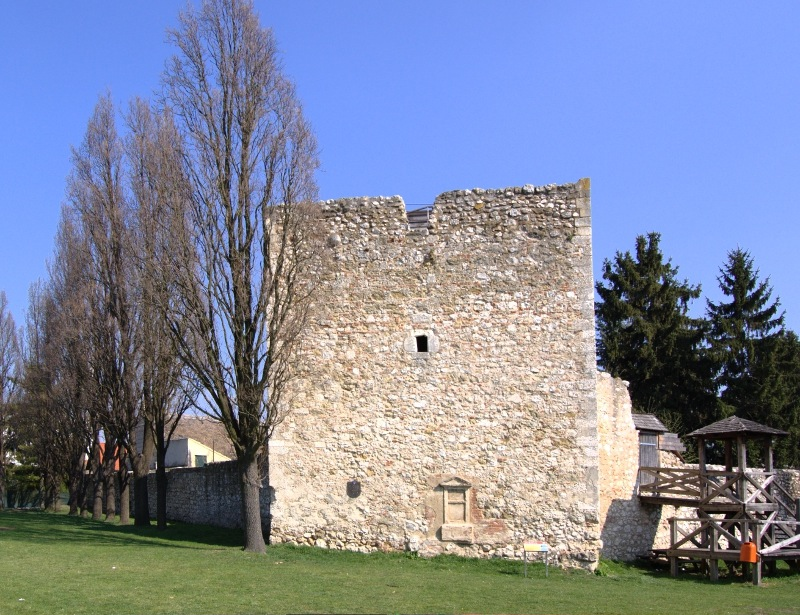
Laa an der Thaya Stadtmauer

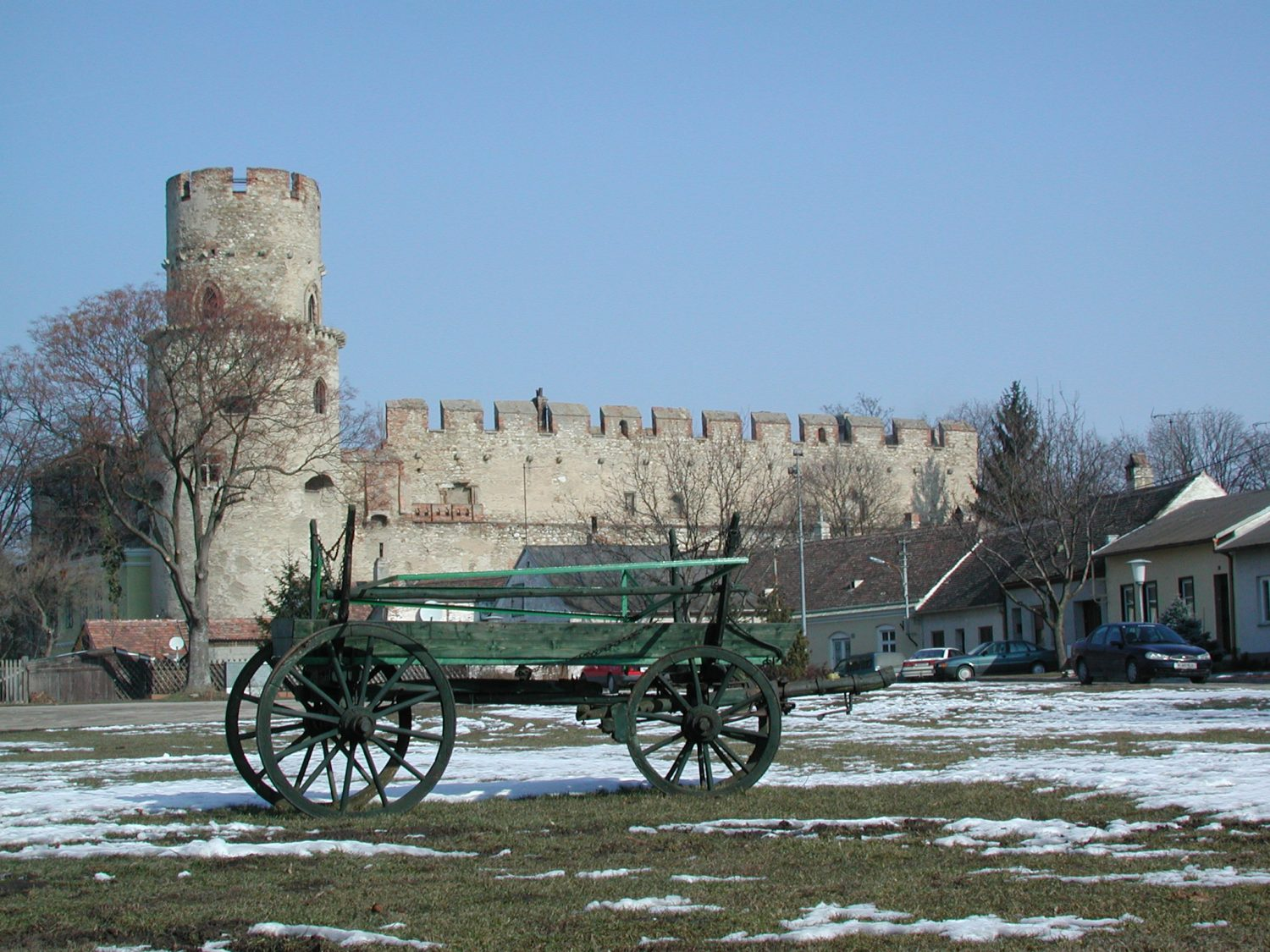

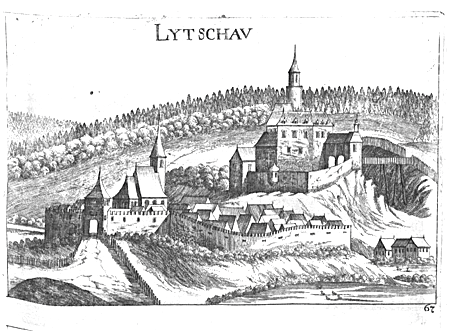
Litshau, Lower Austria by Georg Mätthaus Vischer in 1672

- Litschau was first mentioned in 1215 and received a charter in 1386. Between 1237 and 1297 Litschau was a possession of the Kuenringer and it is possible that during this period the town was laid out and the walls built. The Vischer print of 1672 shows a simple wall with crenellations and gun casemates below. There was a gate-tower on the E. Some fragments of wall survive and there appears to have been a moat on the north side.
- Maissau was first mentioned in 1114 and noted as town in 1380, but the placename suggests that it was of Slavic origin ‘Missov’. Vertical images and property boundaries suggest a roughly oval banked and palisaded enclosure, to which the castle was added on the NW. There is a surviving gate tower on the northeast and this is joined to the castle defences by a wall along the line of the earlier enclosure. The gateway to the castle is also on the line of the enclosure.
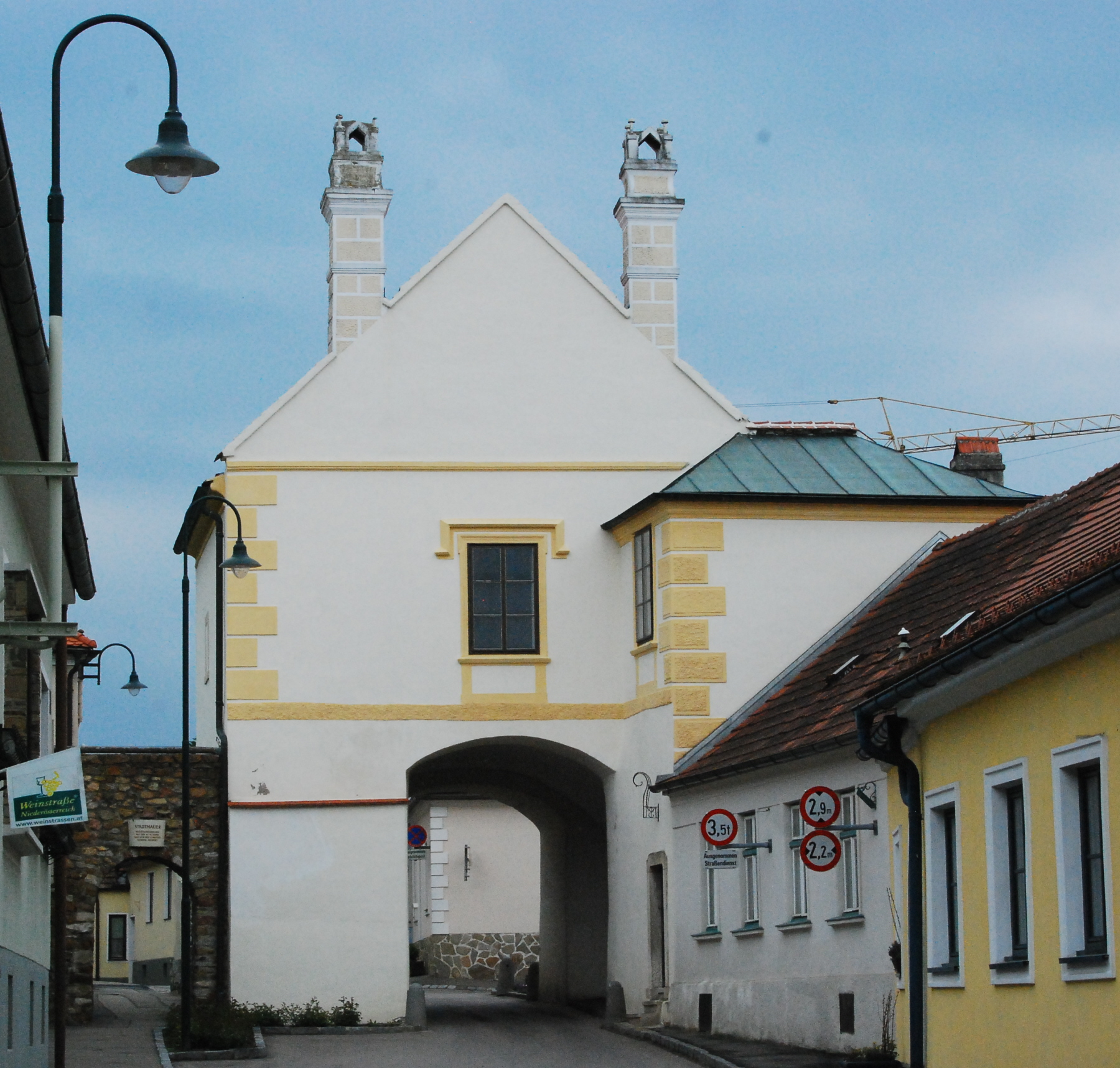
Maissau Stadttor

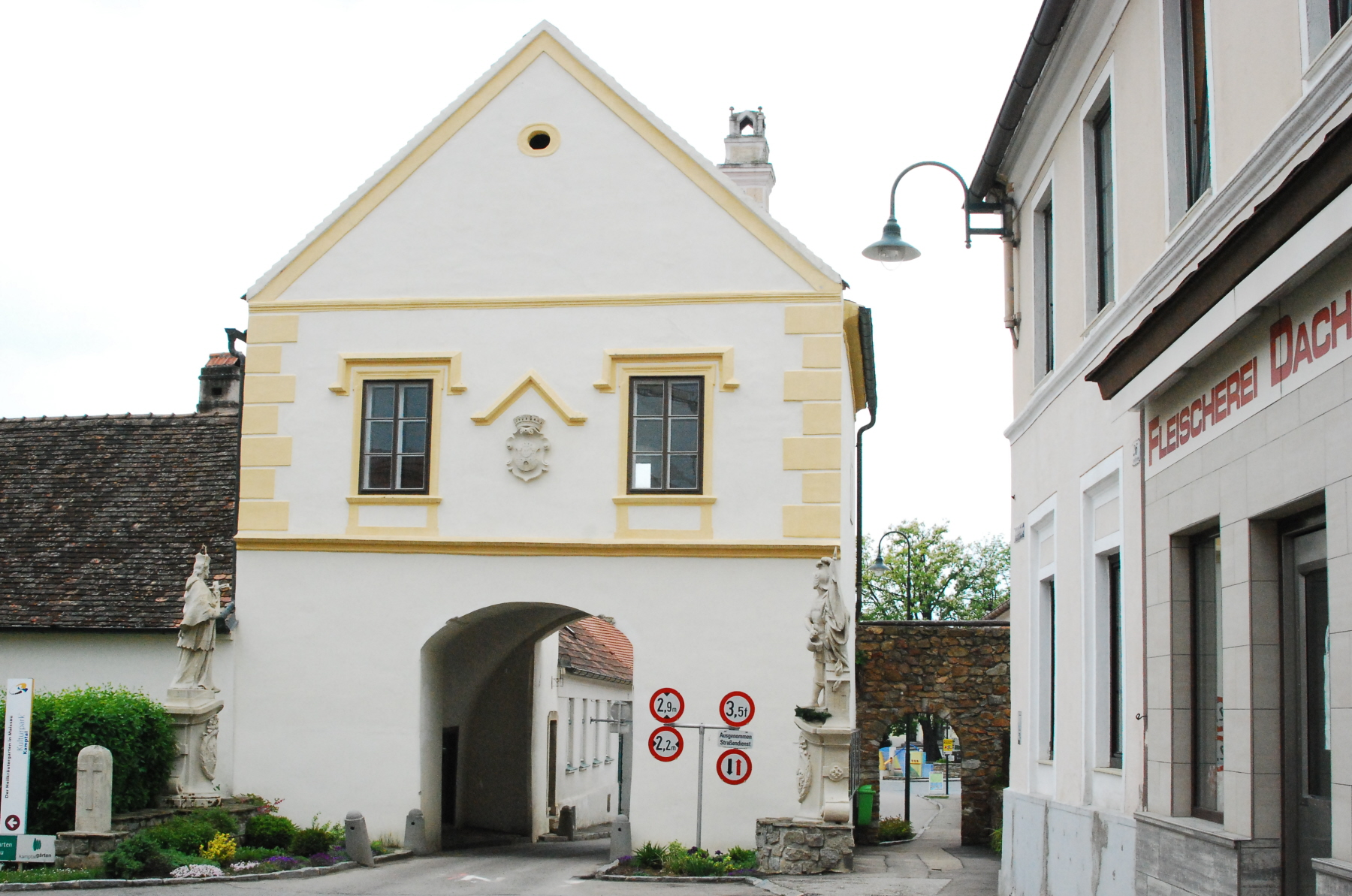
Maissau Stadttor

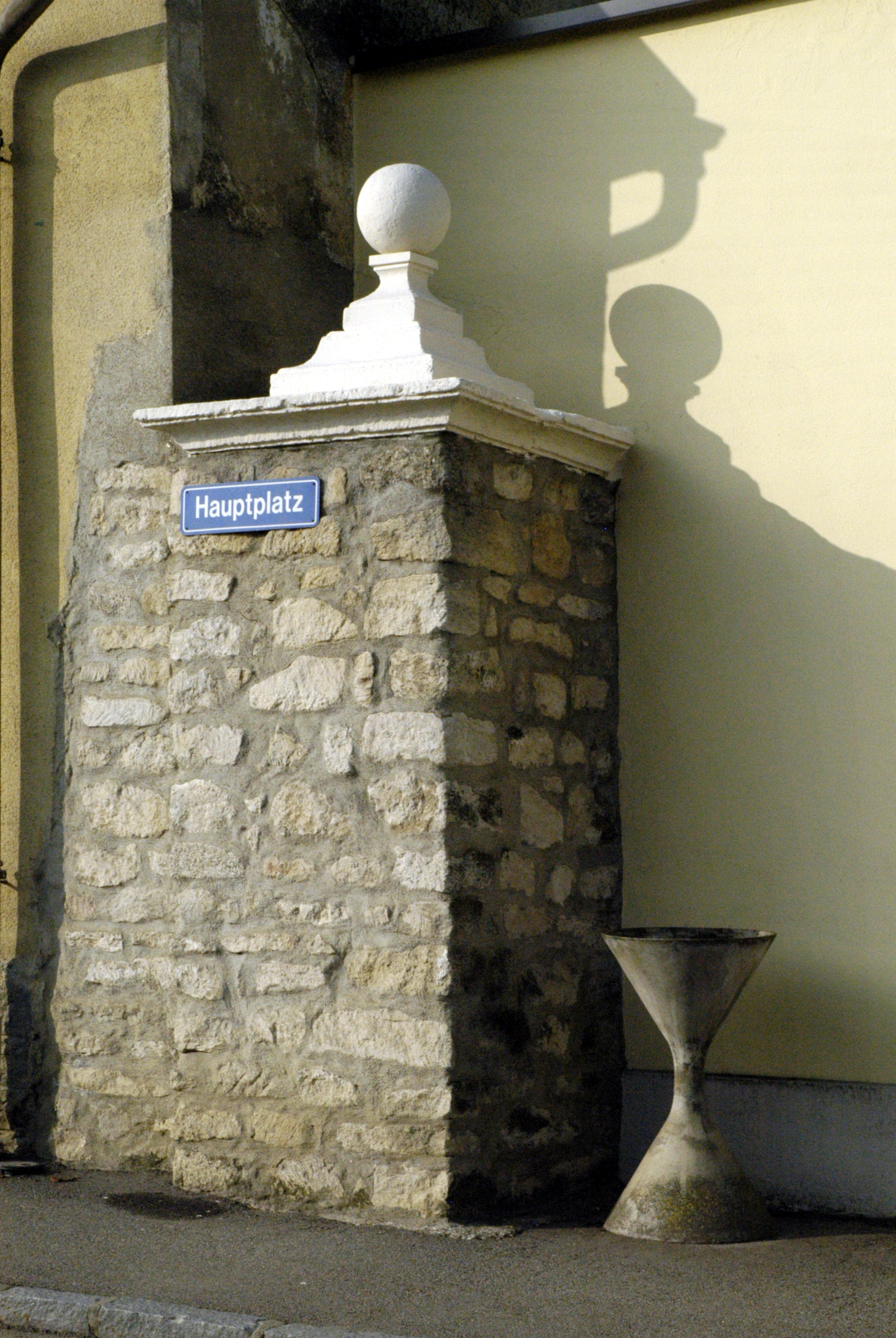
Maissau Stadt walls

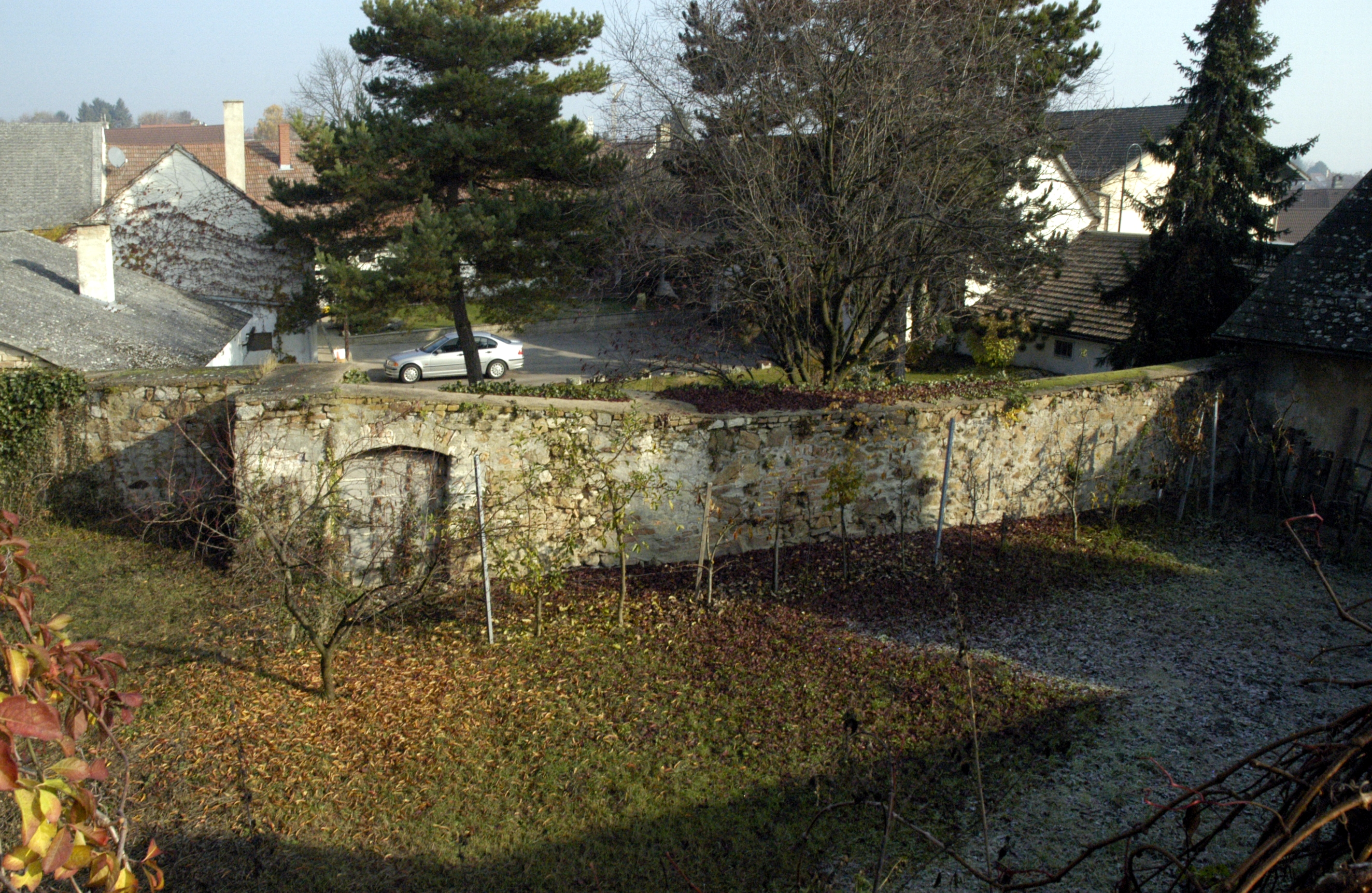
Maissau Stadt walls

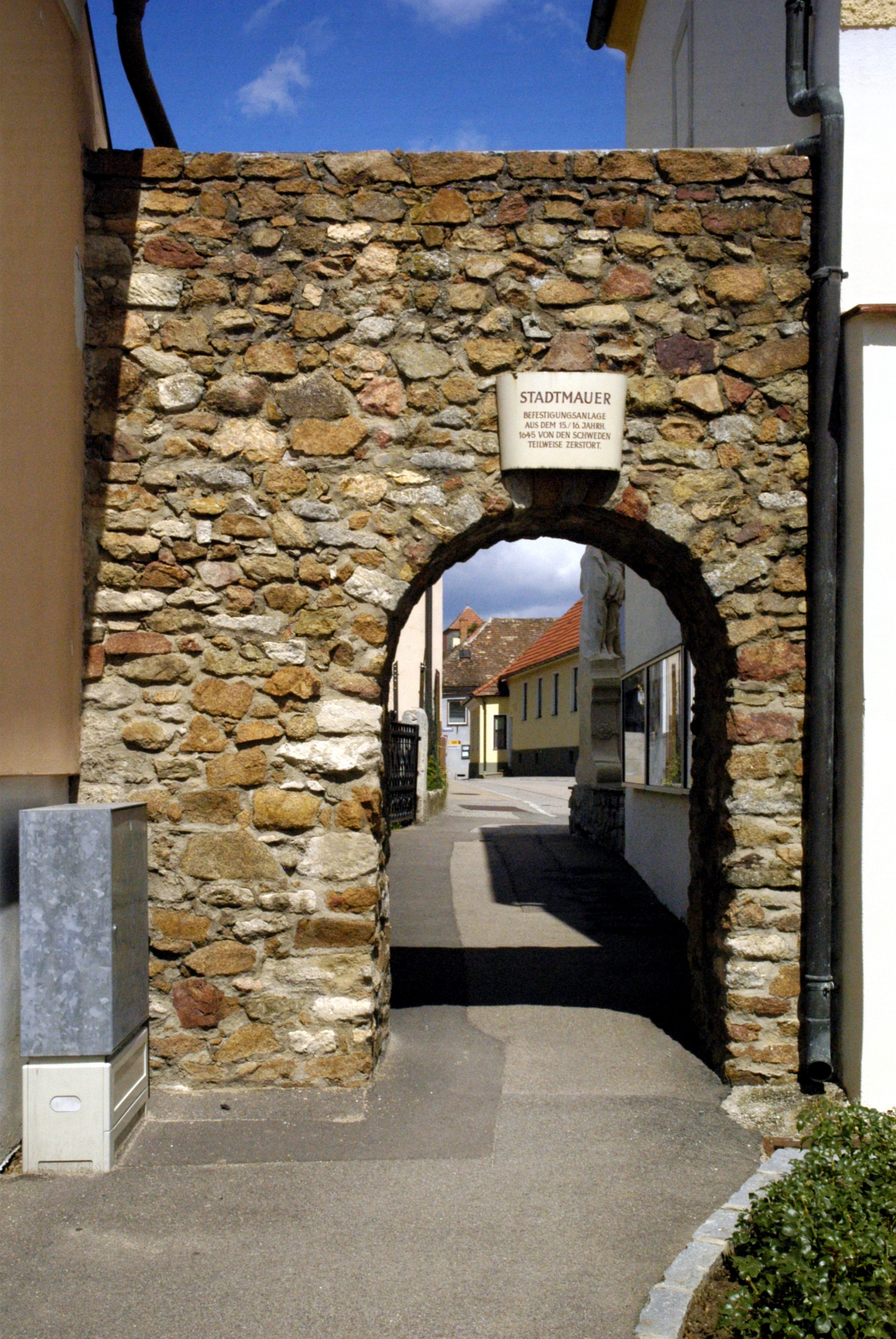
Maissau Stadt walls
- Marchegg lies on the border of Austria and Slovakia, on the historic border with Hungary, immediately adjacent to the river March. Today the modern settlement is much smaller than the very large rectangular area – 800x750 metres – the largest medieval planned settlement in Lower Austria, which is covered by fortifications which are clearly demarcated on the ground and in property boundaries. The town offers unrivalled opportunities for archaeological and geophysical survey to show how towns of this period were laid out and fortified. The town was founded by the Bohemian King Ottokar II in 1268, and he established the castle which is at the northwest corner. Following the battle at nearby Durnkrut in 1278, Ottokar was killed and his territories passed to the Habsburg Duke Rudolf. The large rectangular layout of the town is more in keeping with Duke Rudolf's planned towns than Ottokar's. Marchegg was intended to secure the Moravian and Hungarian borders and to encourage cross-border trade. Some idea of the fortifications can be gained from Vischer’s print of 1672 showing a walled town with a gateway adjacent to a round tower and another square corner tower. Portions of two gates survive, the Vienertor and Ungartor, lengths of wall, and one round tower.
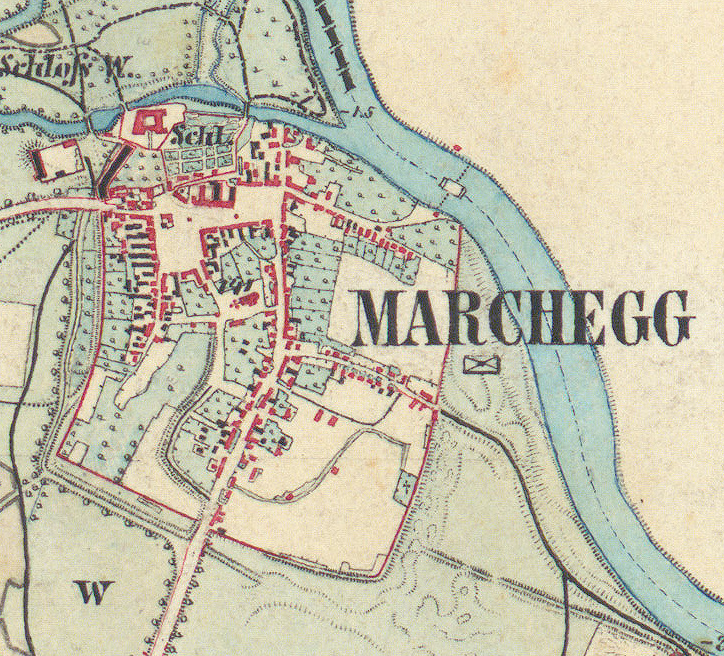
Marchegg. Franziszeische Landesaufnahme 2nd Military Survey c. 1835

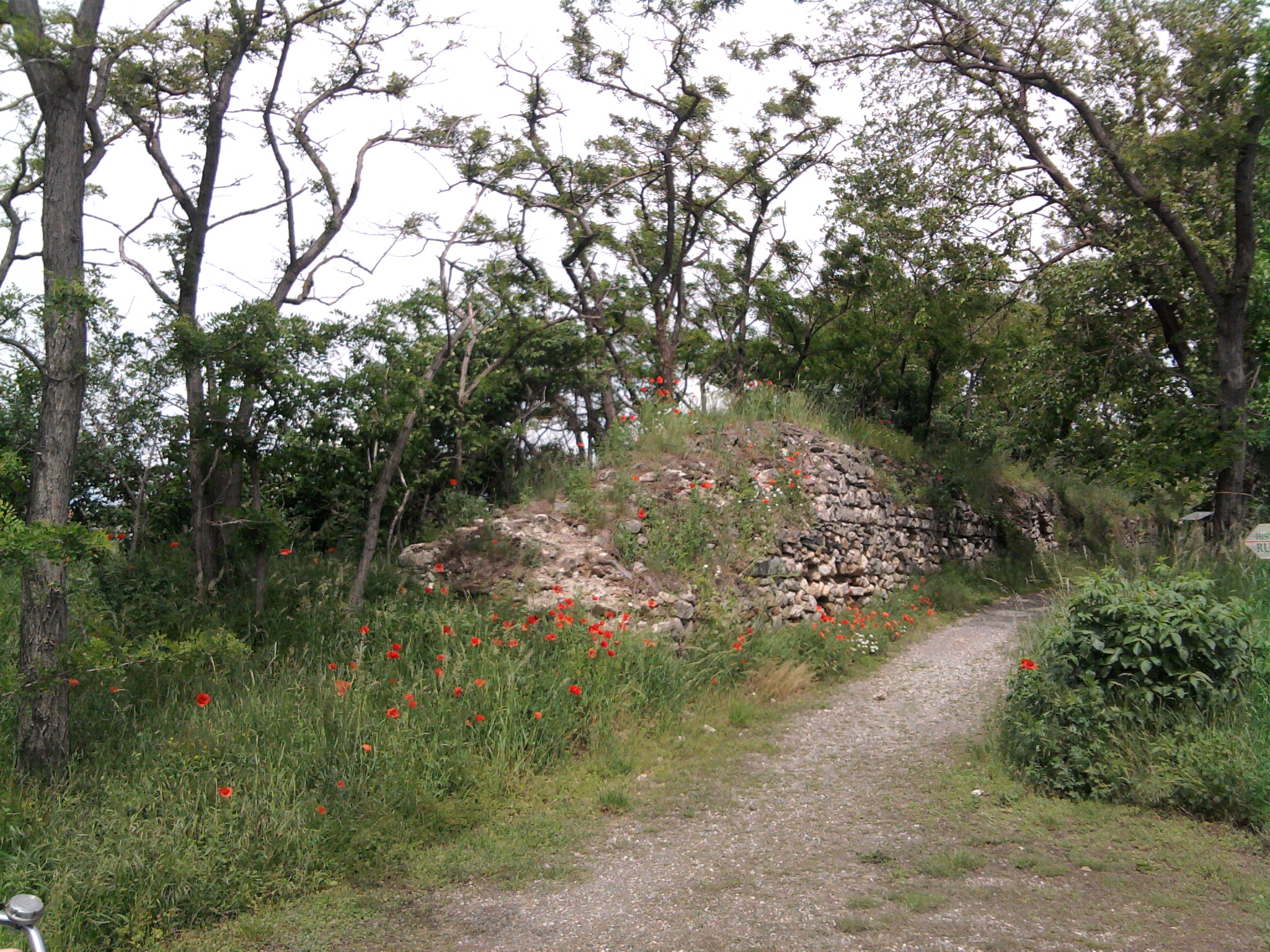
Marchegg alte Stadtmauer 2013

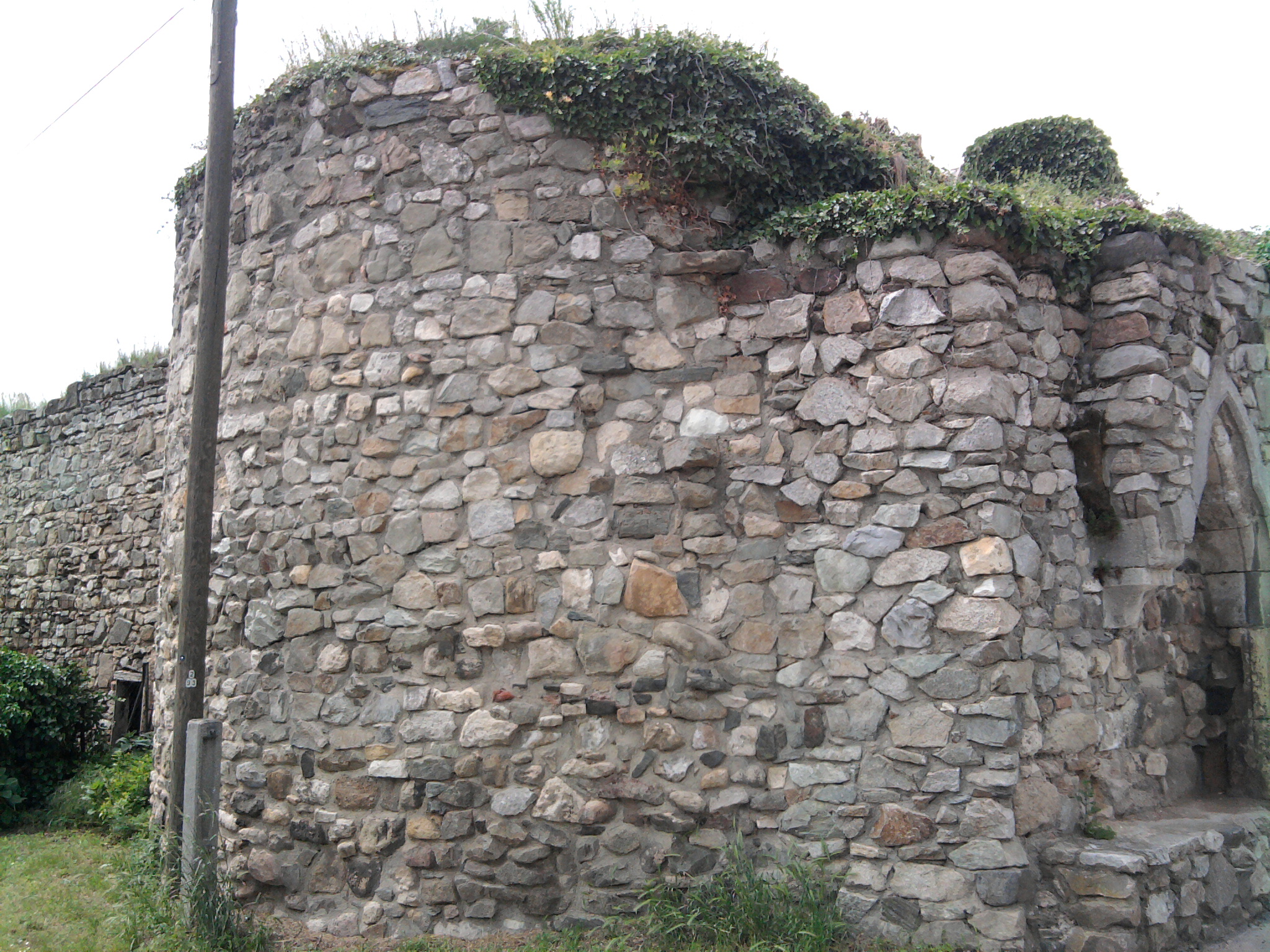
Marchegg alte Stadtmauer mit Ungartor 2013

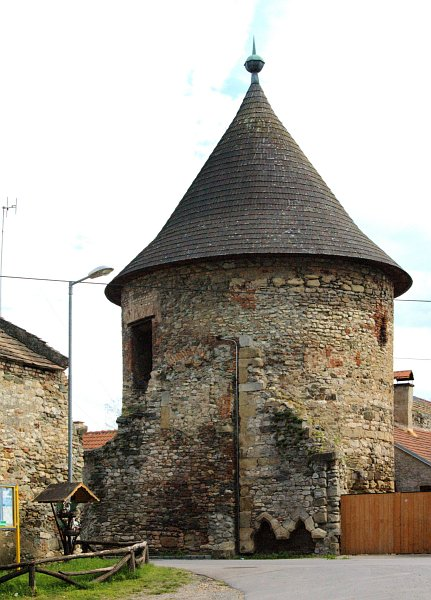
Marchegg Wienertor

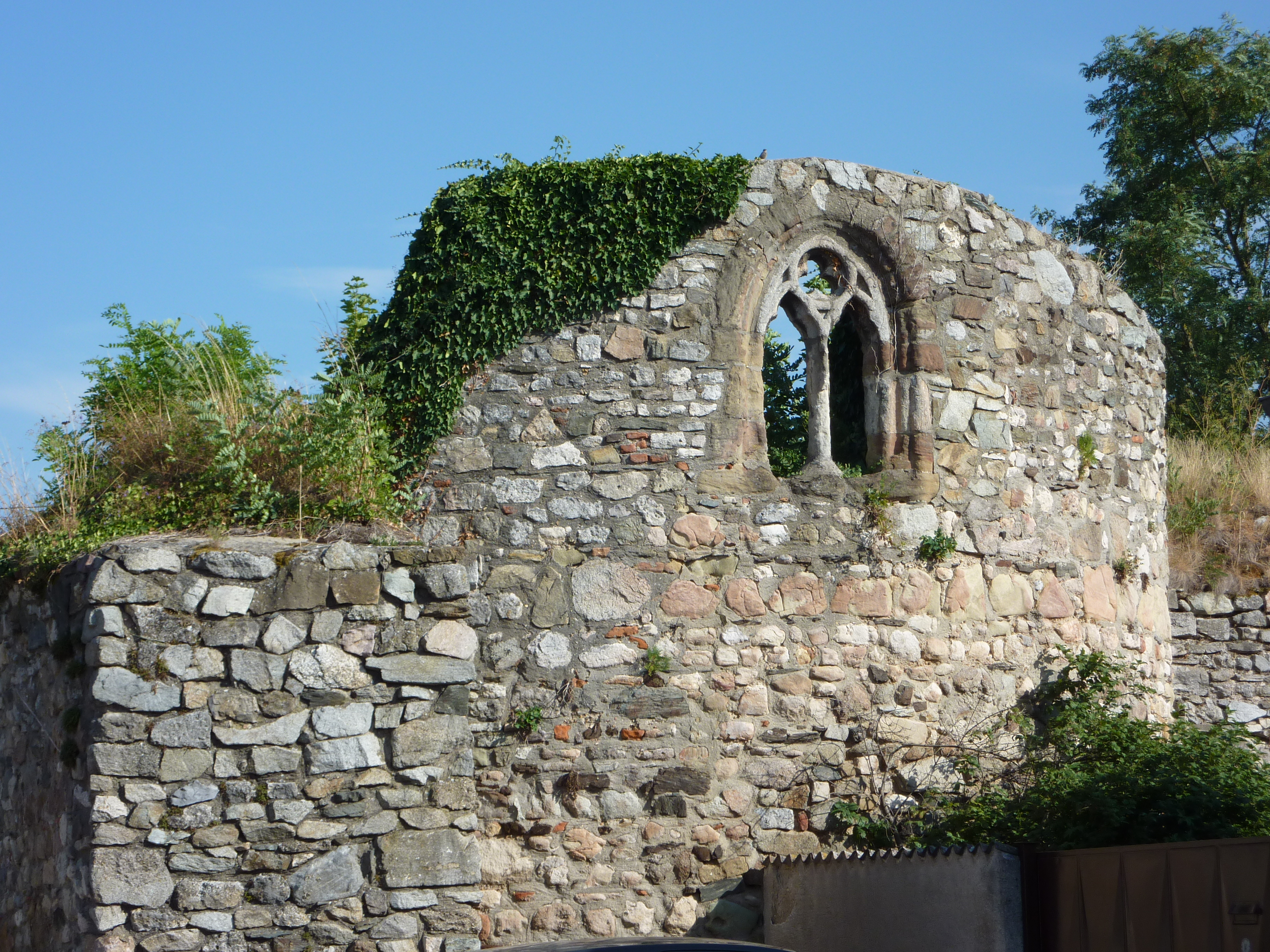
Marchegg Ungartor

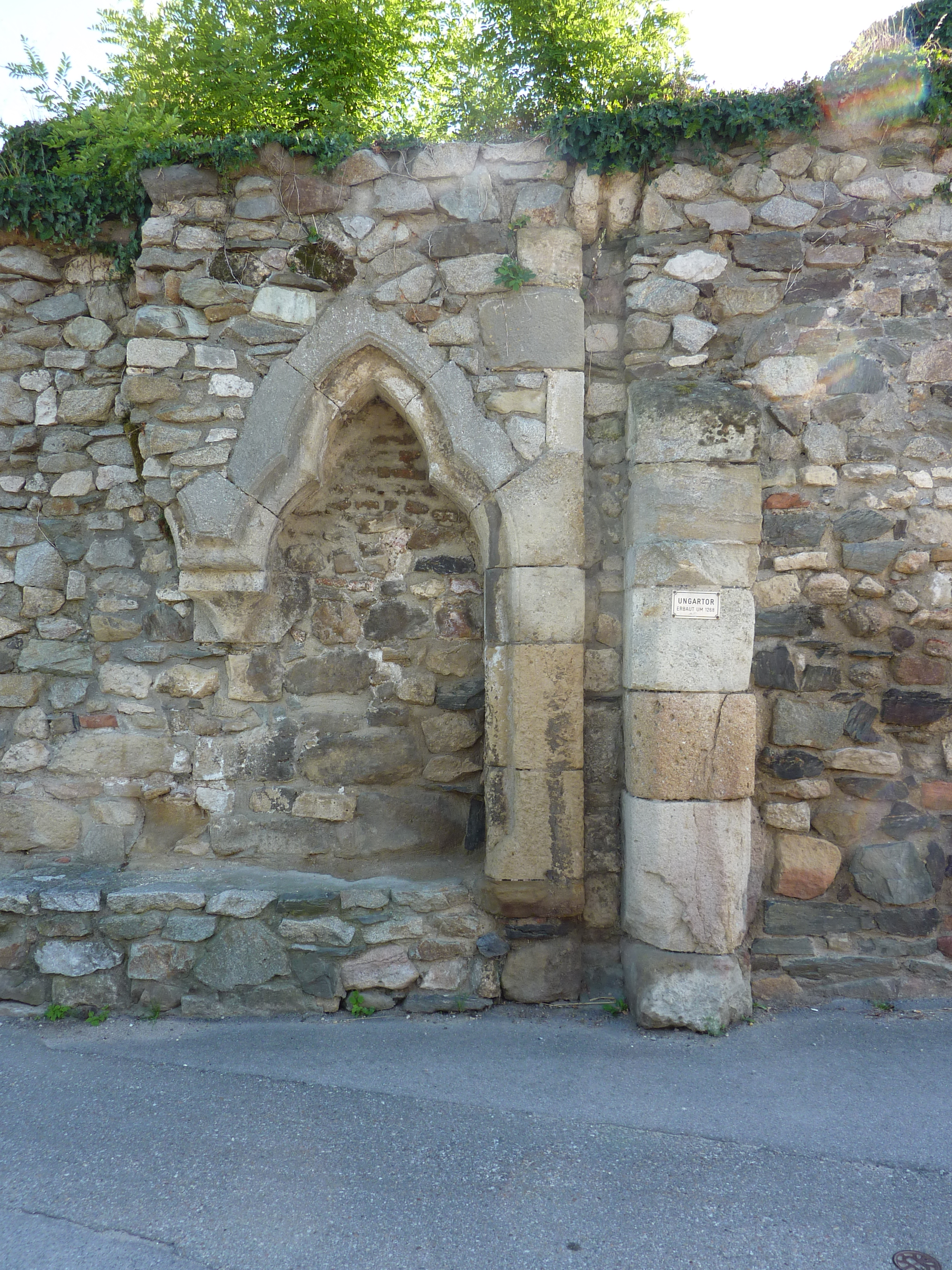
Marchegg Ungartor

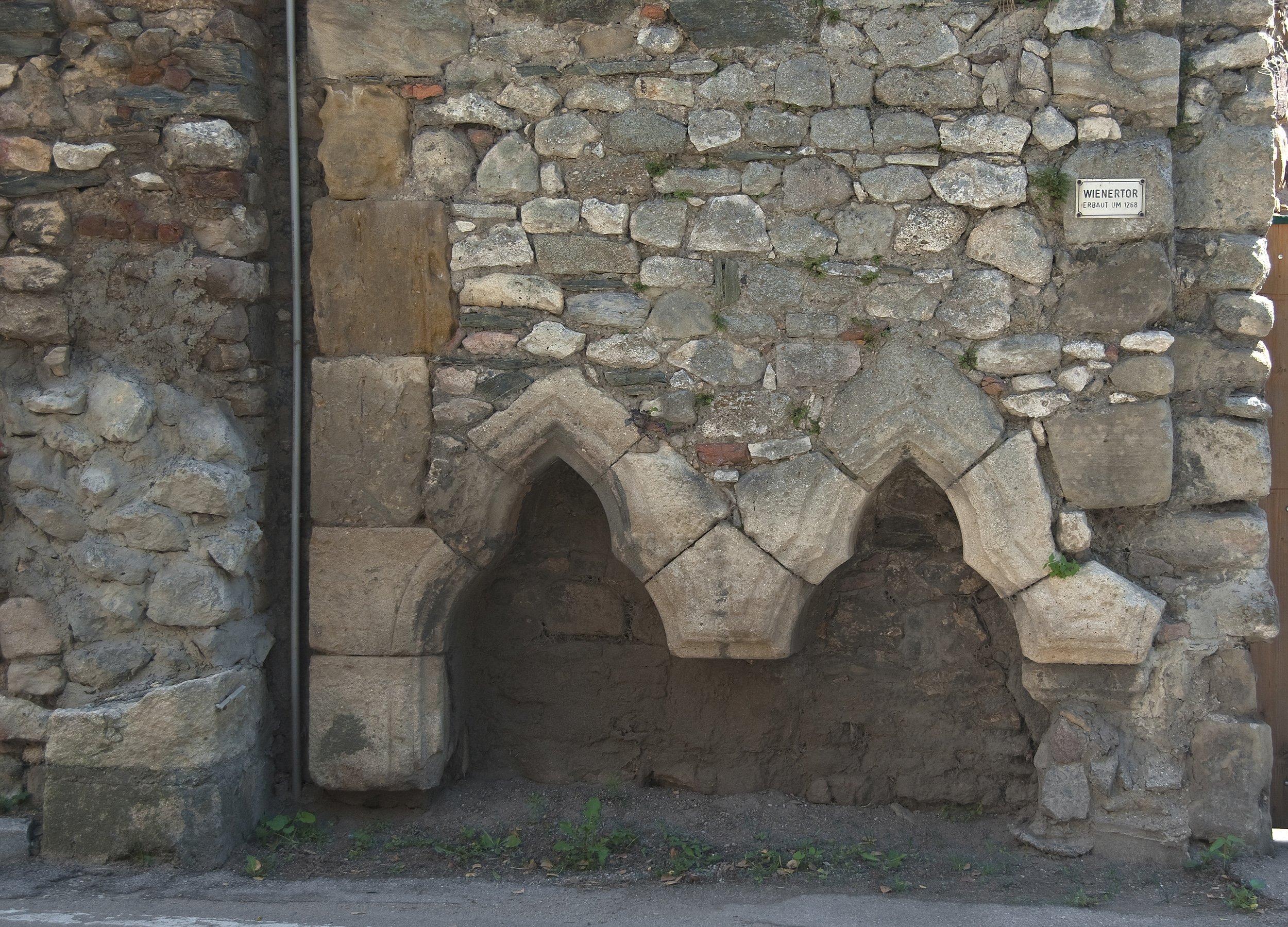
Marchegg Niches at Wienertor
- Mautern was the site of the Roman Auxiliary Camp of ‘Favianis’. In medieval times the Roman walls were re-utilised as a defensive circuit. The original rectangular Auxiliary camp was smaller than the medieval walled area - occupying the area immediately to the south of the Church to the Alte Friedhofstrasse. In the late 3rd/4th centuries a detachment of the ‘legio I Noricorum’ was stationed at Mautern and the Roman walled enclosure was extended northwards towards the Danube. In 1463 Mautern was joined by a bridge over the Danube to the walled town of Stein. Merian's print (1679) shows Mautern from the south as a rectangular walled town with a gate-tower and a bridge over a moat. The southeast corner of the wall is curved, suggesting it is on the line of the Roman camp defences. Modern property boundaries are also curved at this corner and there are still remains of the demi-lune bastion, which was shown on the Merian print. At the southwest corner at the junction of Missongassse and Alte Friedhofstrasse, Merian shows a tall corner tower that appears to have been rebuilt as the present house in this position. To the north there are rebuilt lengths of the Roman wall which stretch to the Roman Tower, adjacent to the Roman Mautern Museum.
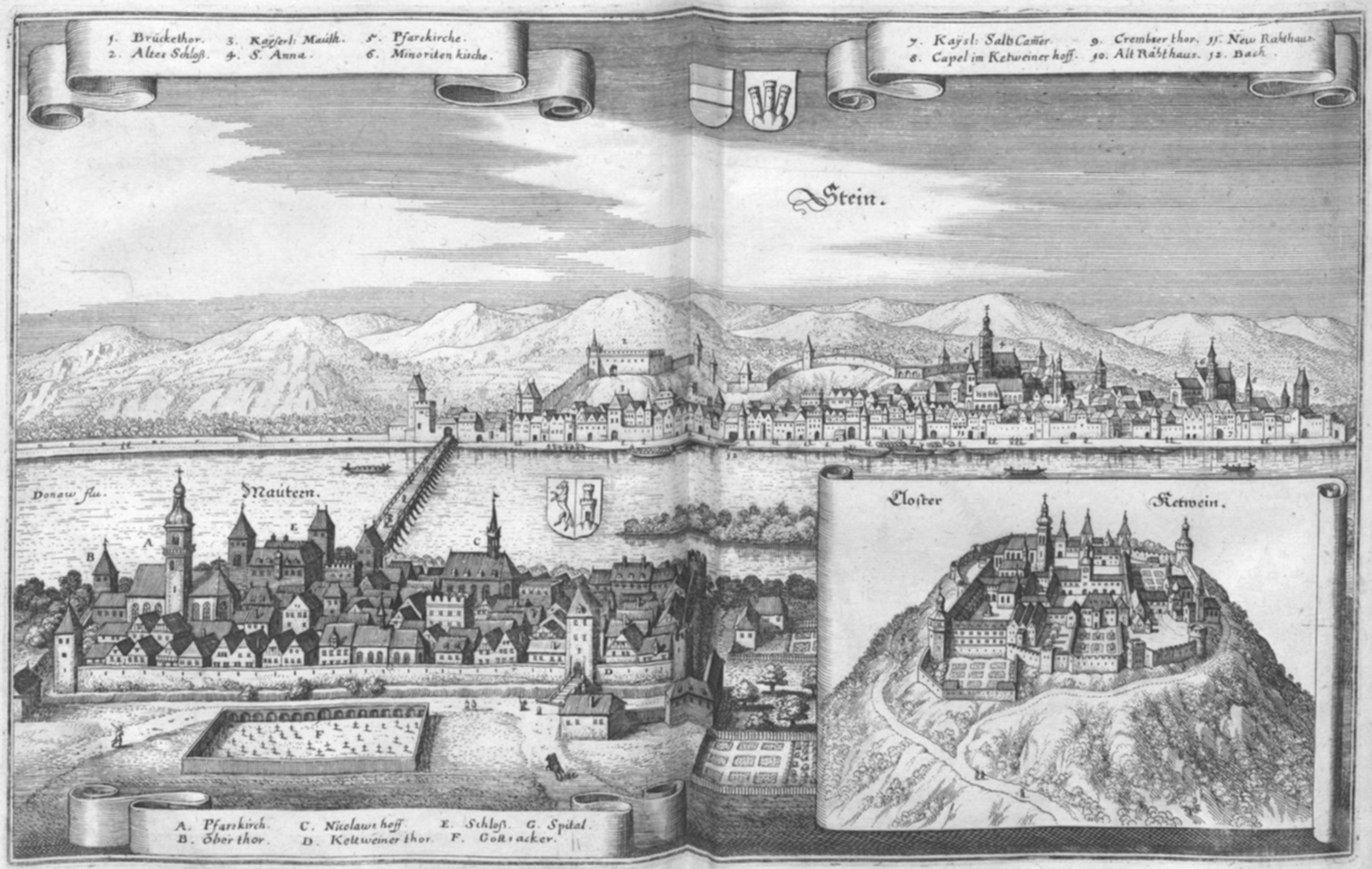
Merian print showing the Danube and Mautern, Stein

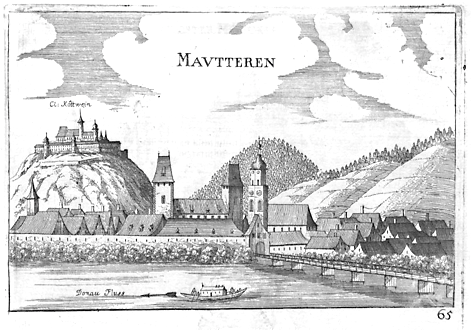
Mautern an der Donau Lower Austria by Georg Mätthaus Vischer in 1672

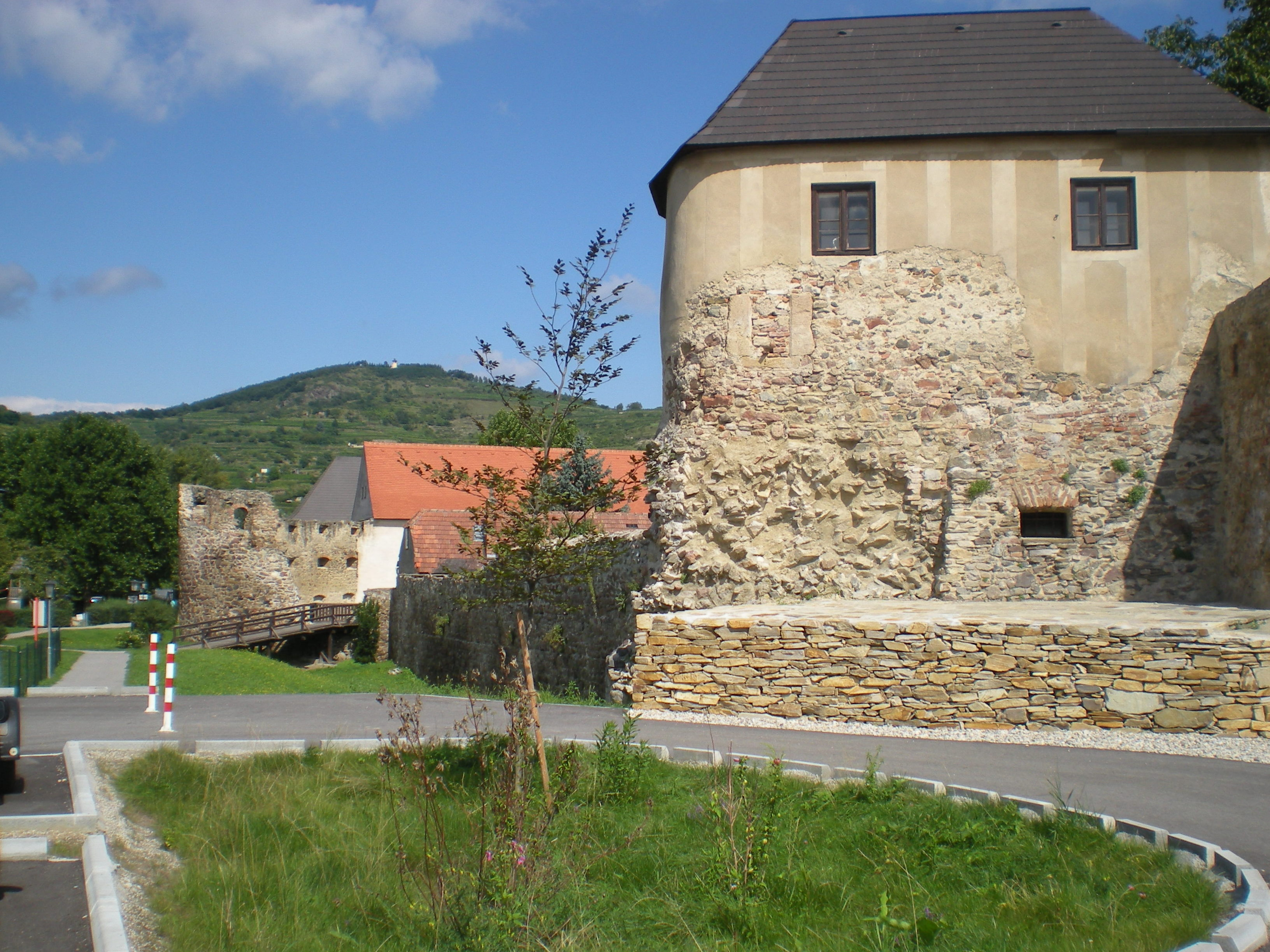
Mautern. Roman bastion or 'Burgi'

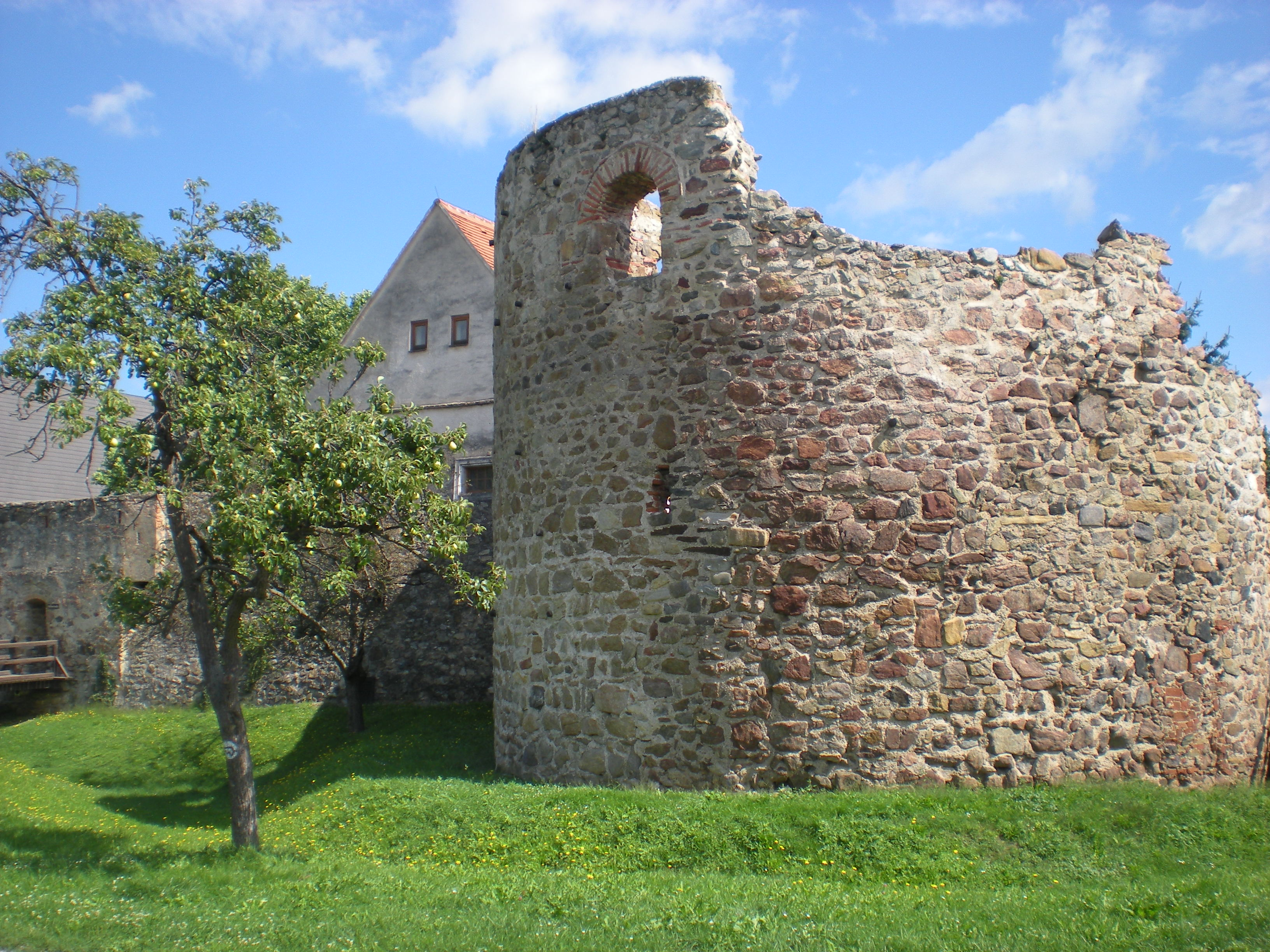
Mautern Hufeisenturm and Town wall

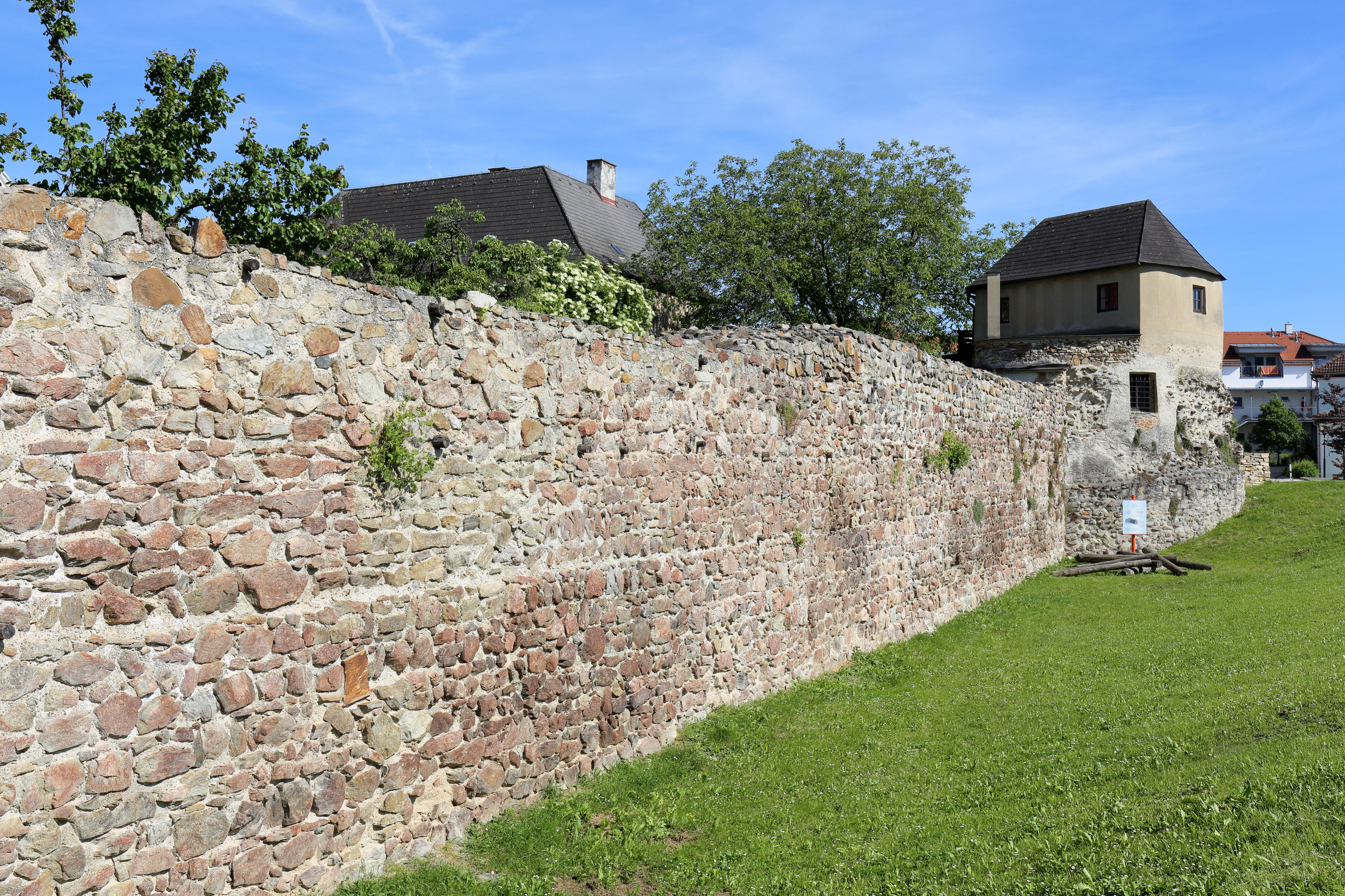
Roman wall, Mautern

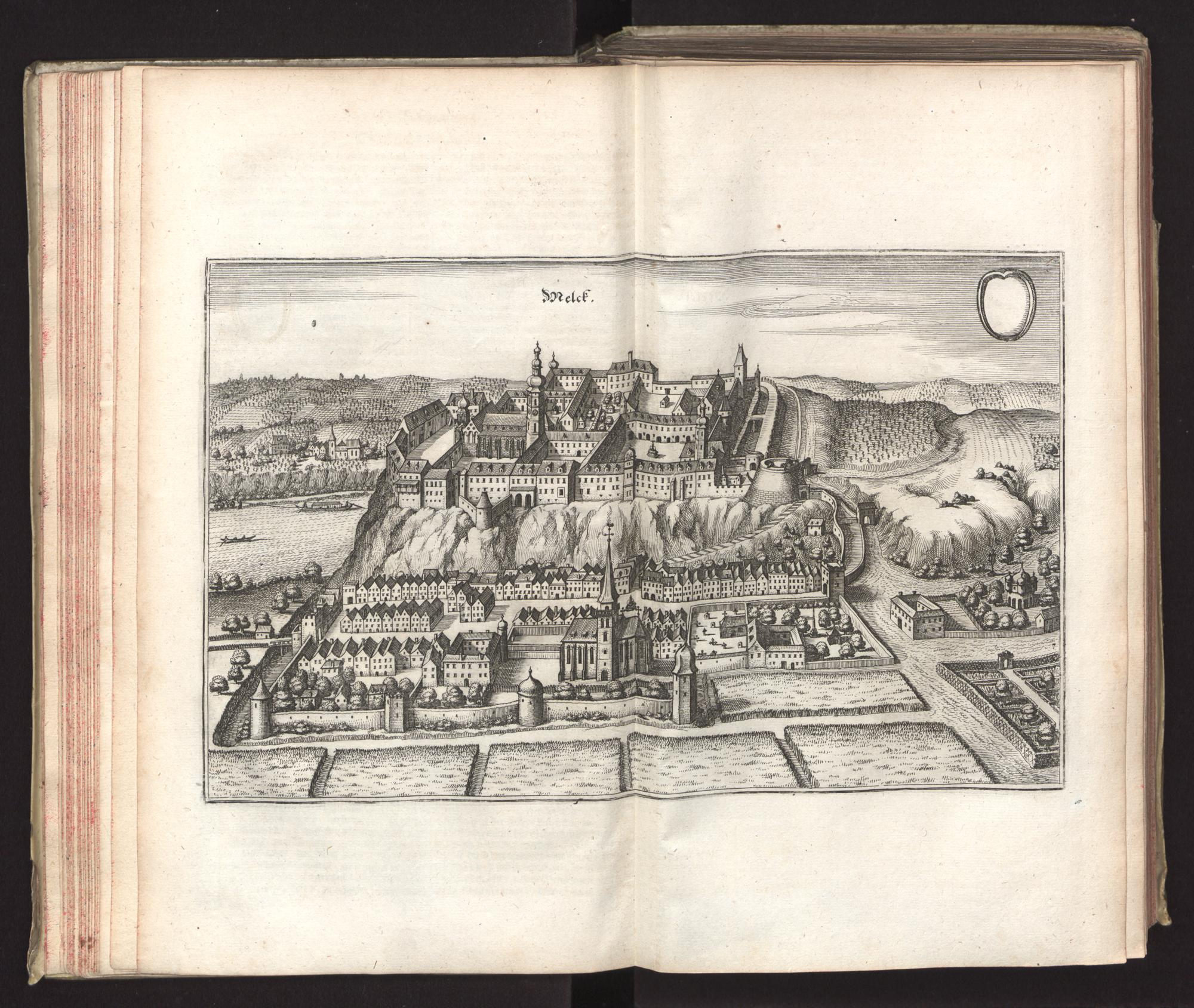
Melk in Merian's Topographia 1679

- Melk town lies to the south of the monastery, received its charter in 1227, but is a much earlier settlement. There is now little evidence of the town walls, apart from a tower close to the church. However Merian’s view in 1679 shows the position of the walls with two gates on the east and west sides of town, and four towers on the southern wall. Also shown is a large roundel tower at the southeast of the Monastery where it joins the walls.
- Pöchlarn was originally the Roman fort of ‘Arelape’. First documented mention in 832, and referred to in the Nibelungenlied (around 1200) as "Bechelâren" seat of the legendary Margrave Rüdiger. Granted a market in 1130 and a charter in 1267 by the Bishop of Regensburg. Merian's print of Pochlarn shows a crenellated wall fronting the Danube with two round towers, one of which, the Welserturn was built in 1482. There were two gate towers on the east &W sides and the castle was in the southeast corner. On the south the rectangular Pfeiferturm survives. Pochlarn would appear to have been partly moated.
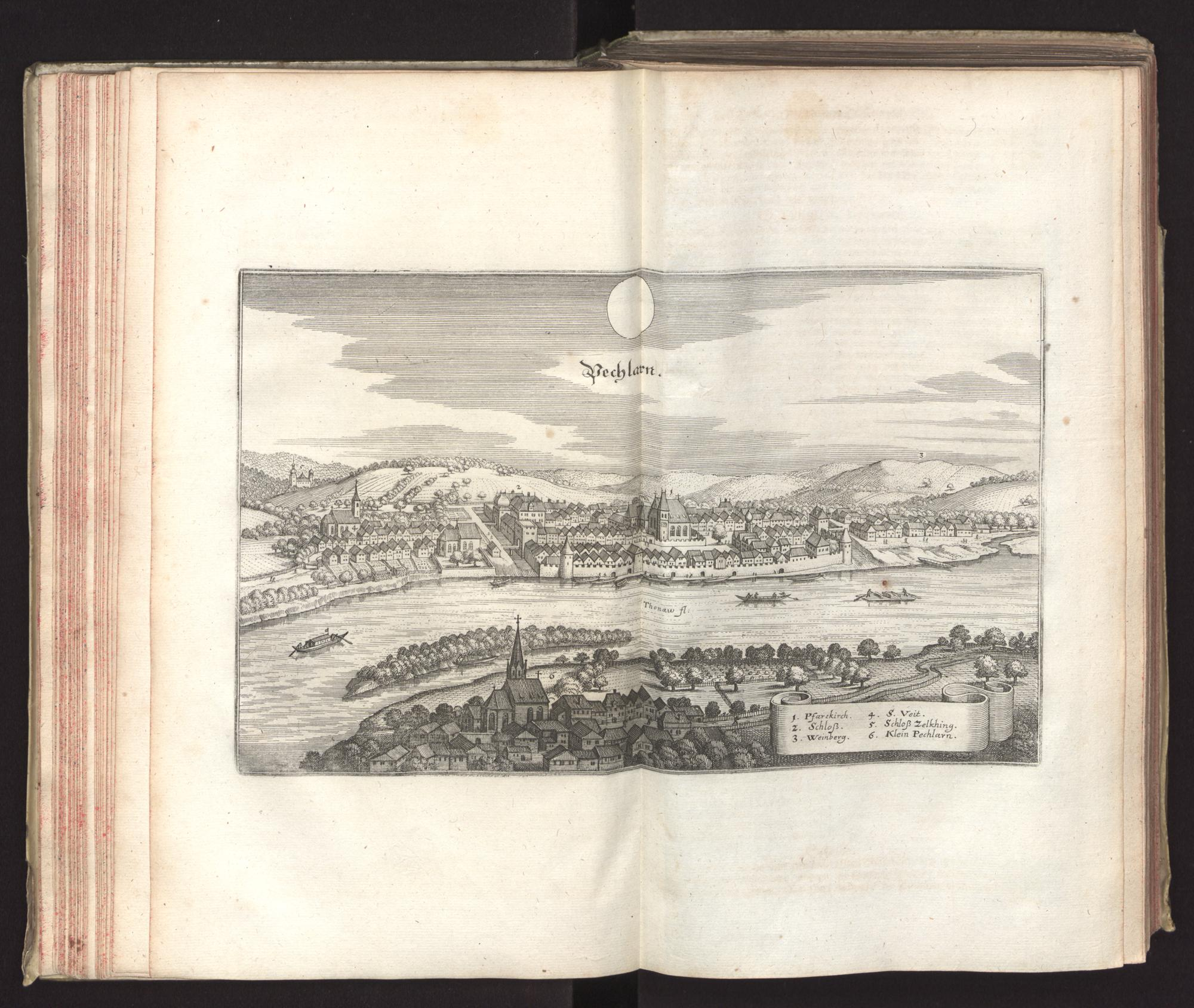
Topographia Austriacarum (Merian)

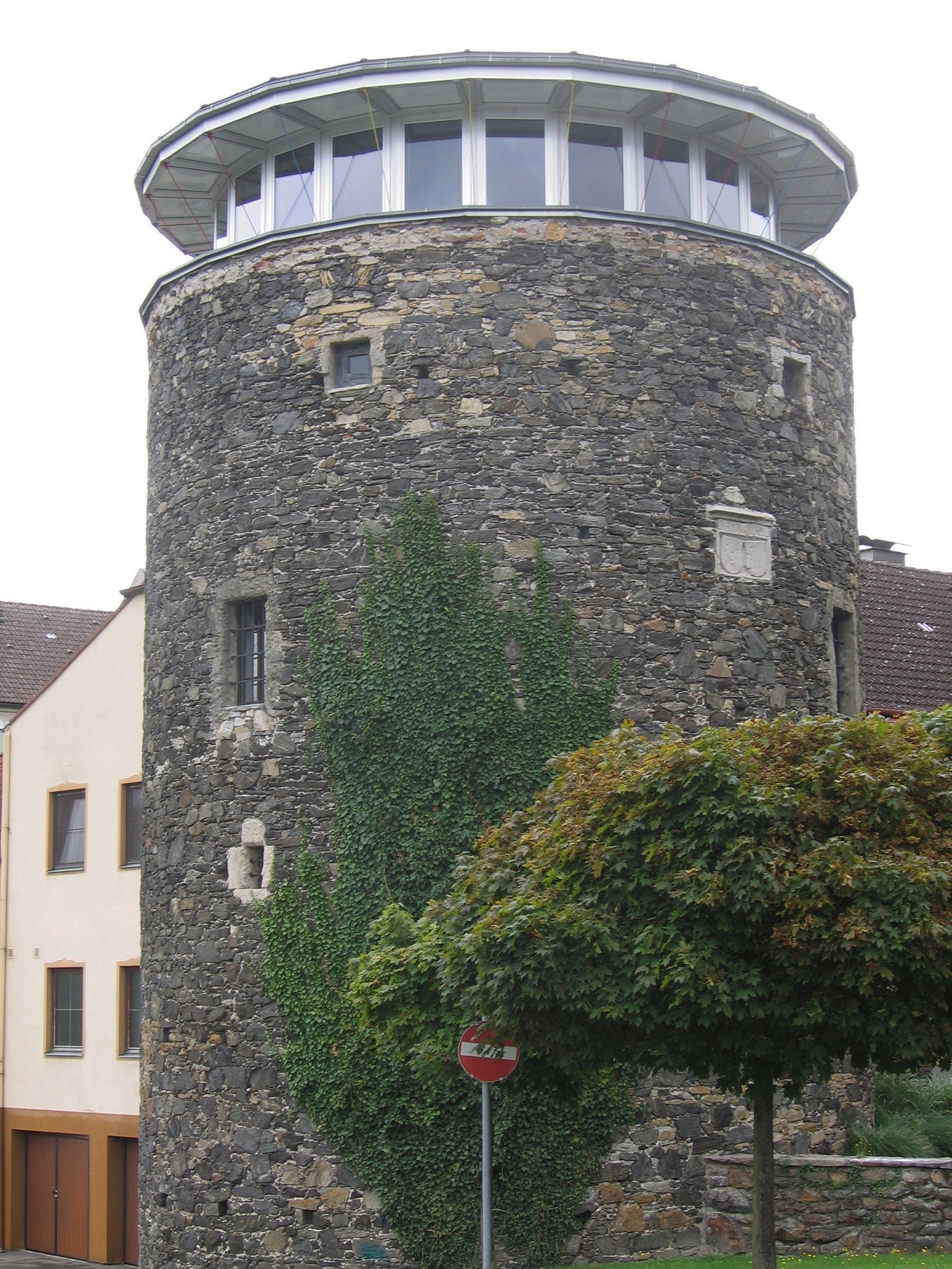
Pöchlarn Welserturm, built 1482

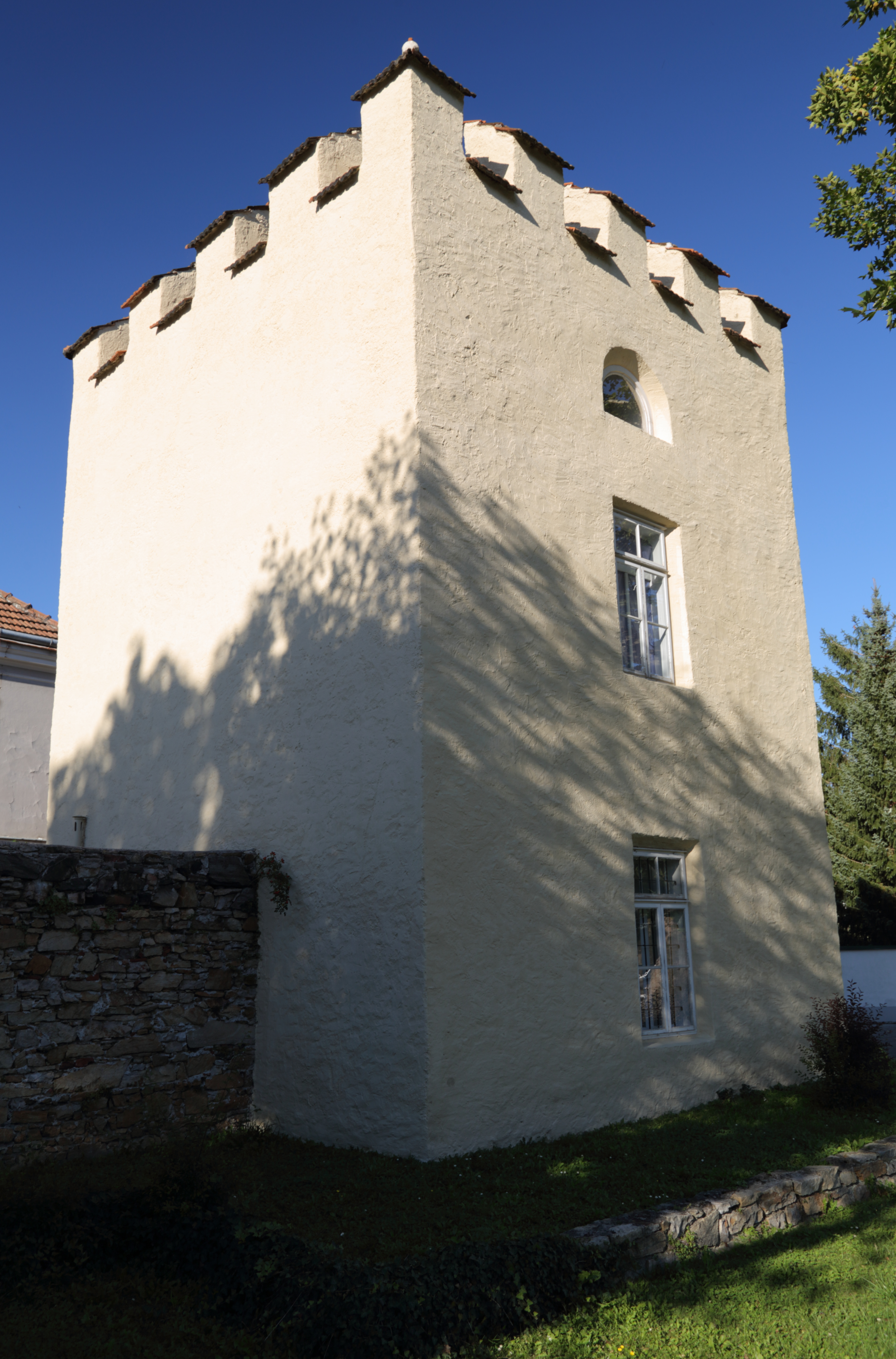
Pöchlarn Pfeifferturm

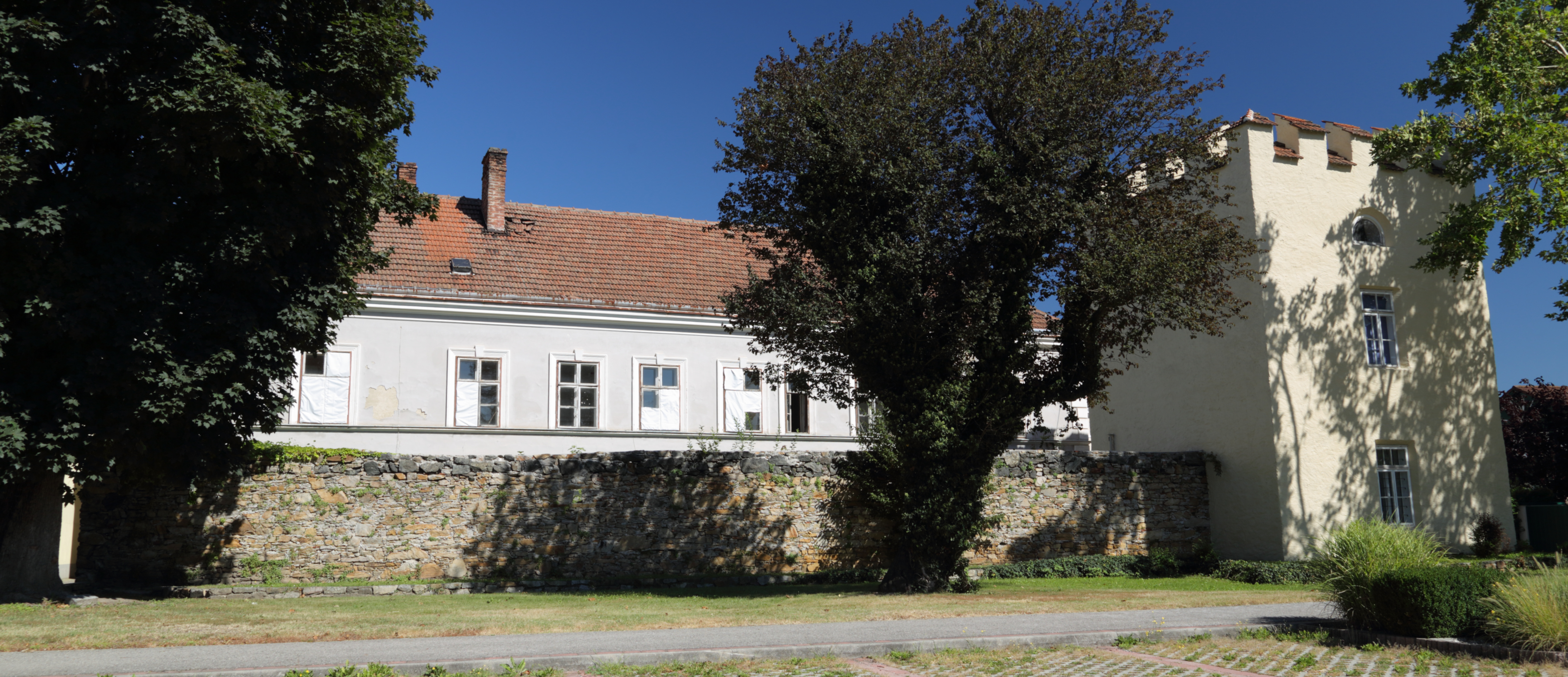
Pfeifferturm
- Raabs an der Thaya
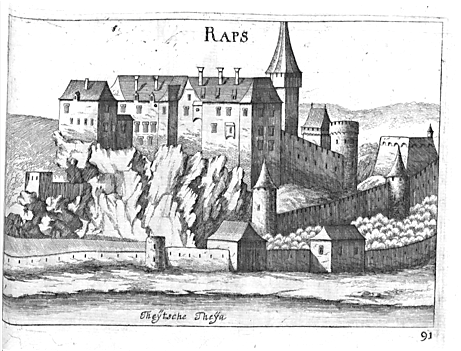
Raabs an der Thaya, Lower Austria by Georg Mätthaus Vischer in 1672

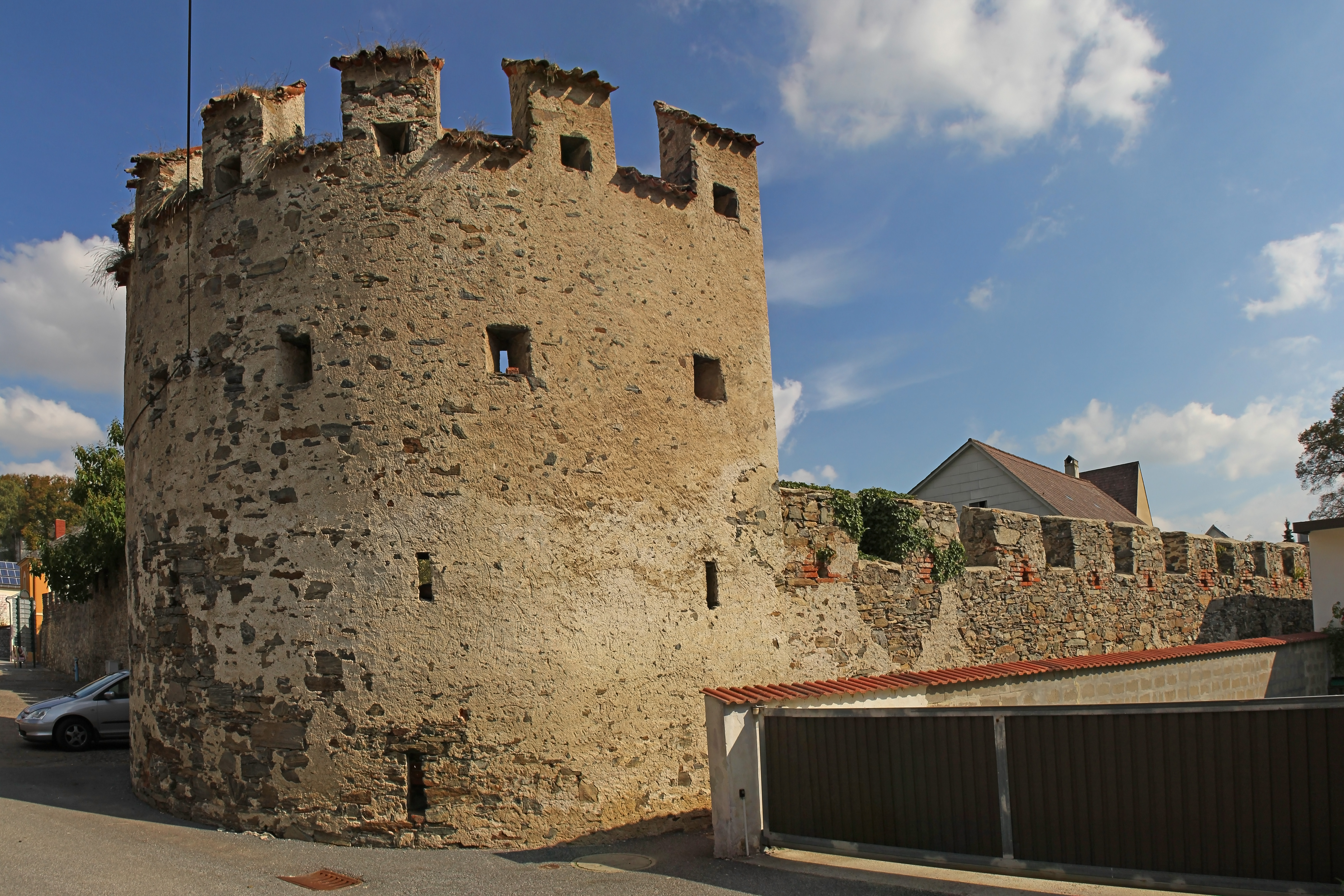
Corner Roundel Tower at Raabs an der Thaya

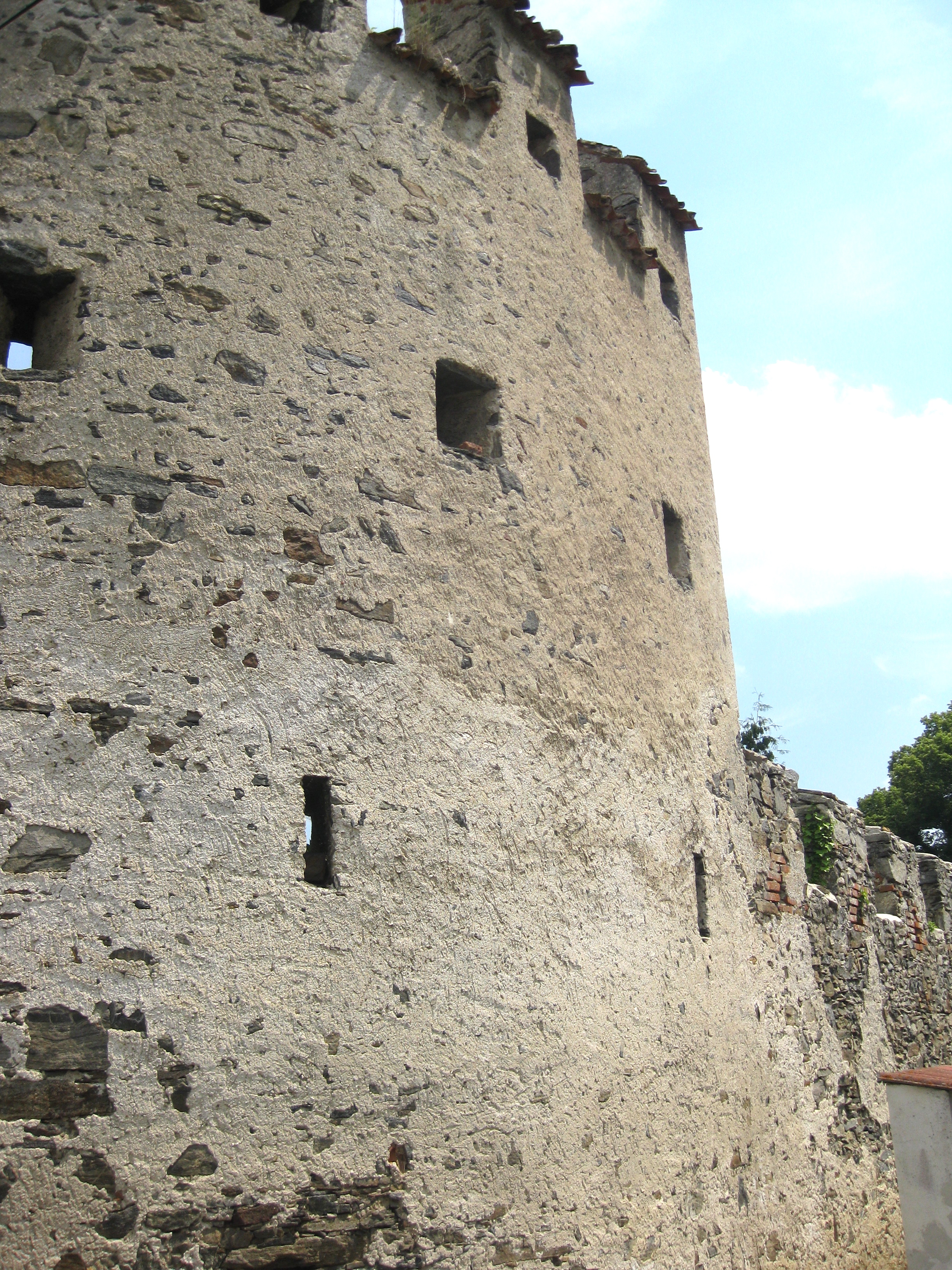
Raabs an der Thaya. Town Wall, corner Roundel Tower

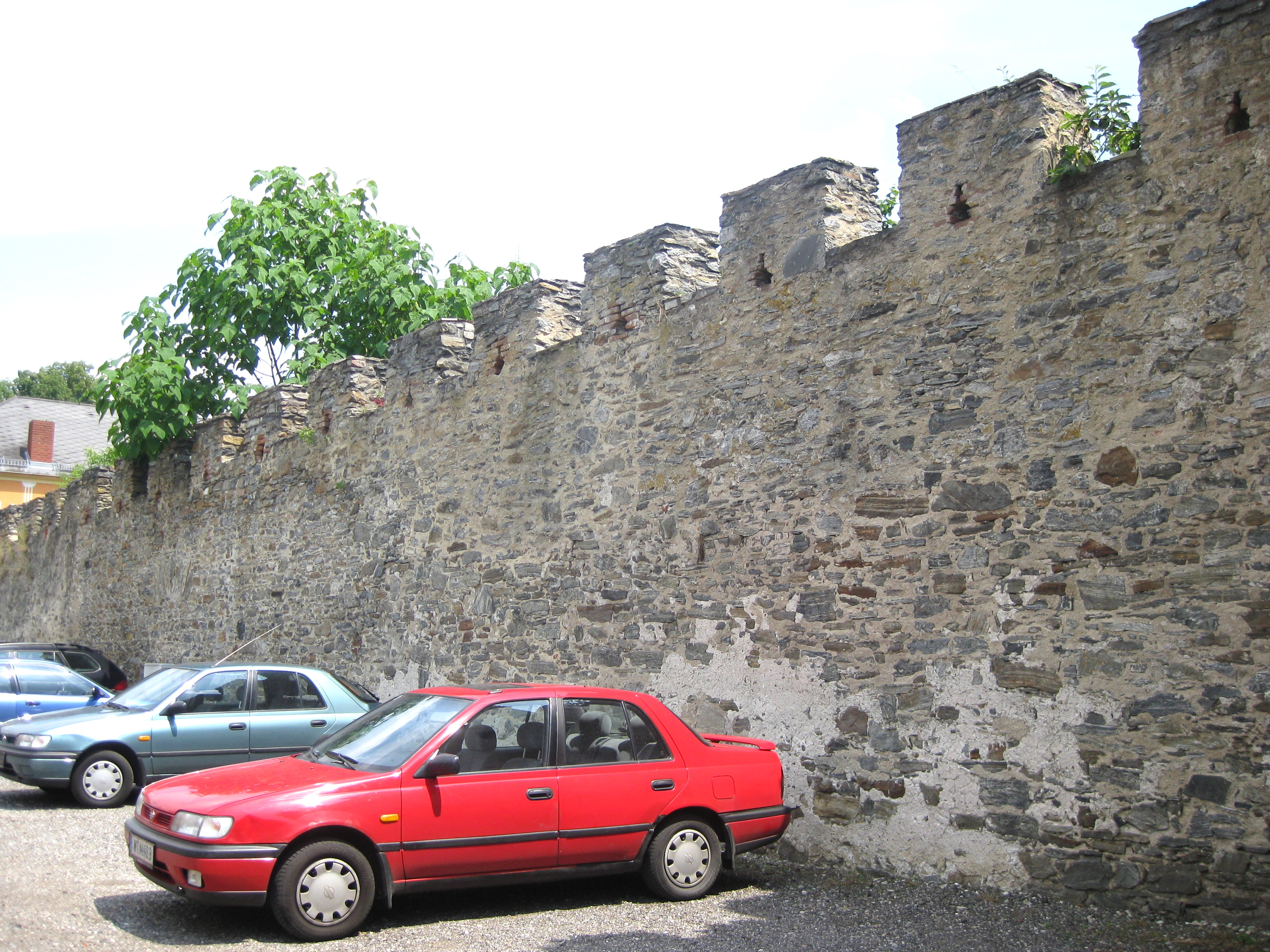
Raabs an der Thaya. Length of Town Wall with crenellation and gun ports in merlons

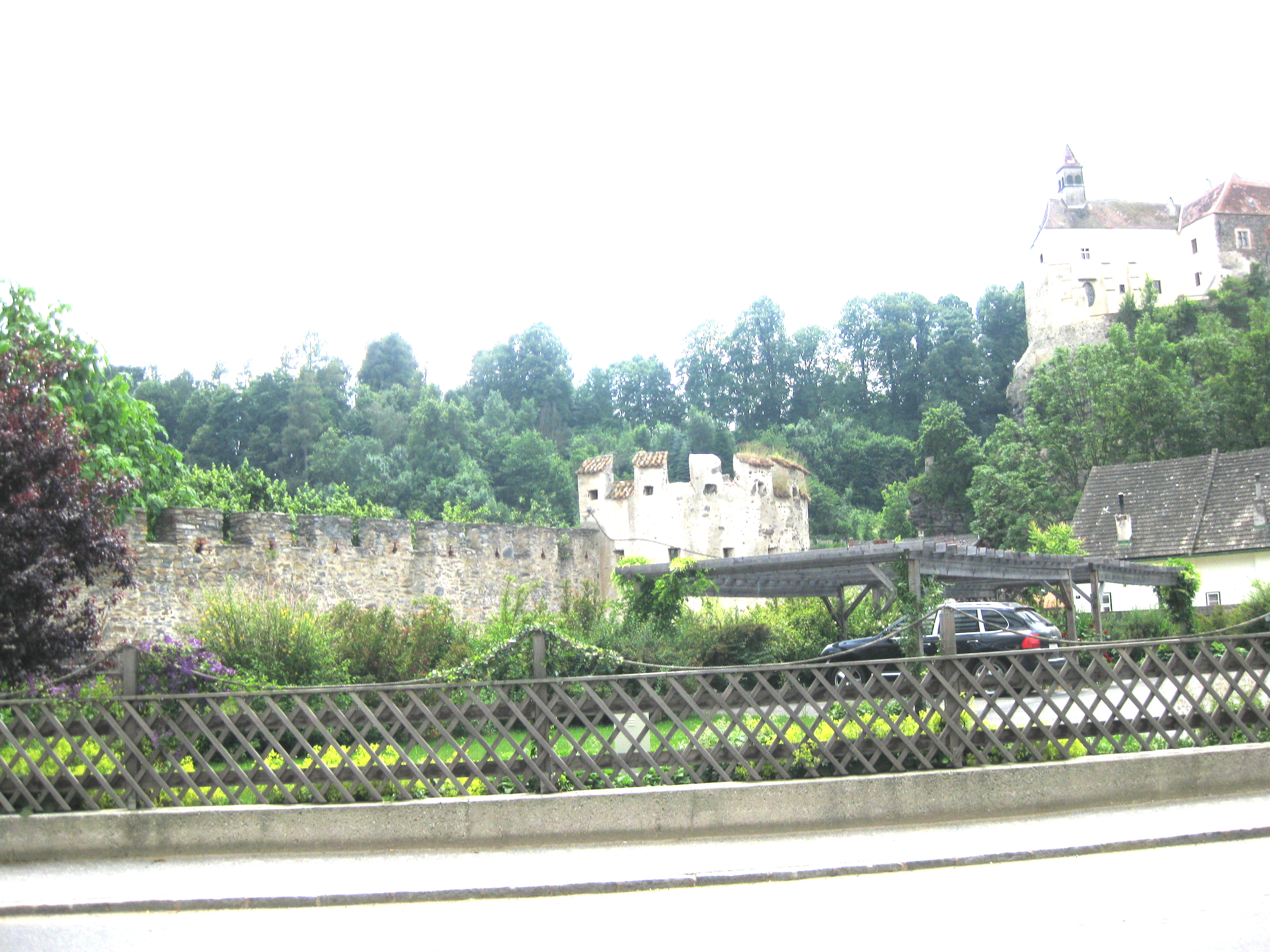
Raabs an der Thaya. Town wall with corner Roundel Tower.

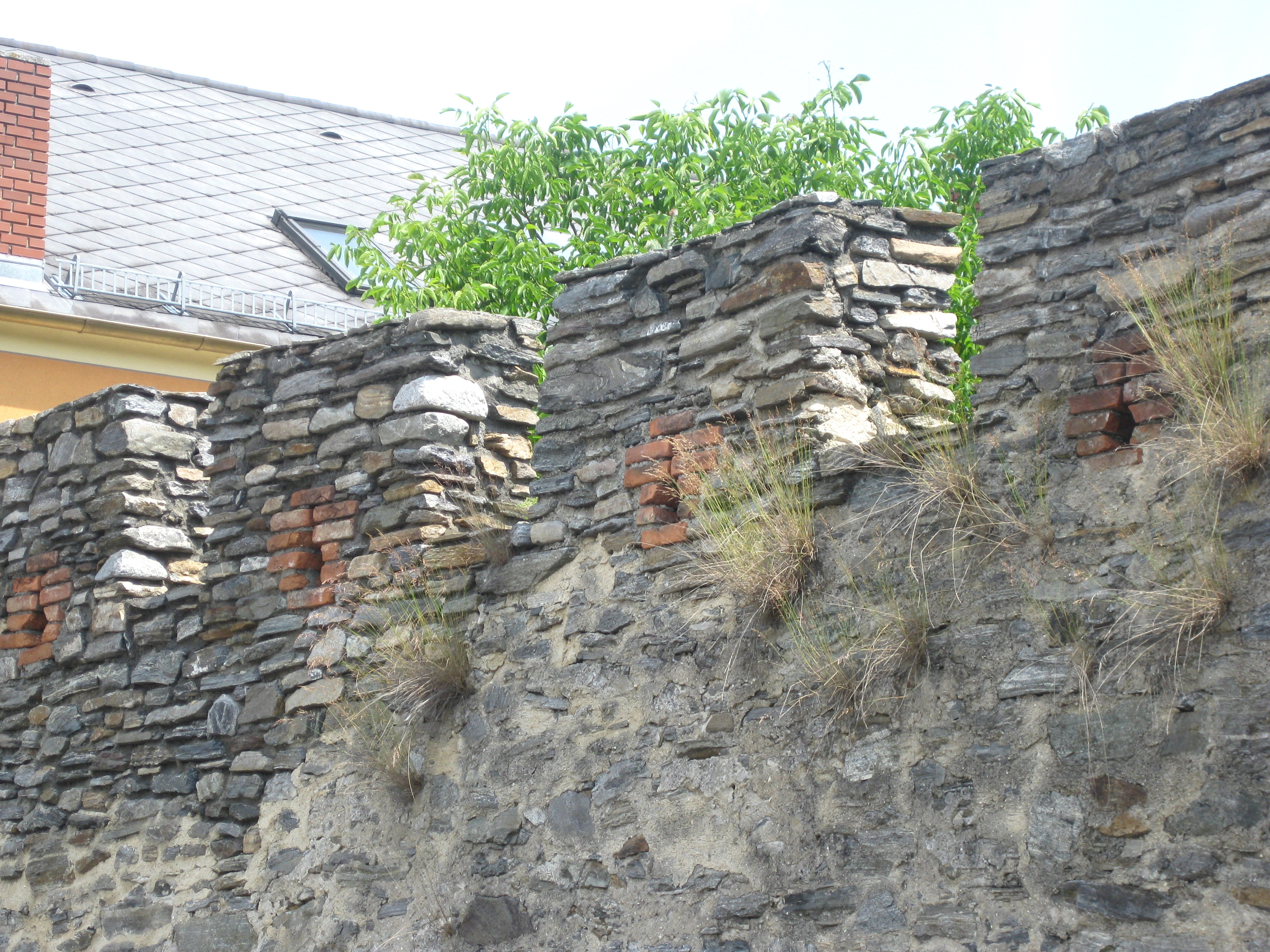
Raabs an der Thaya. Merlons on Town walls with inserted brick gun ports

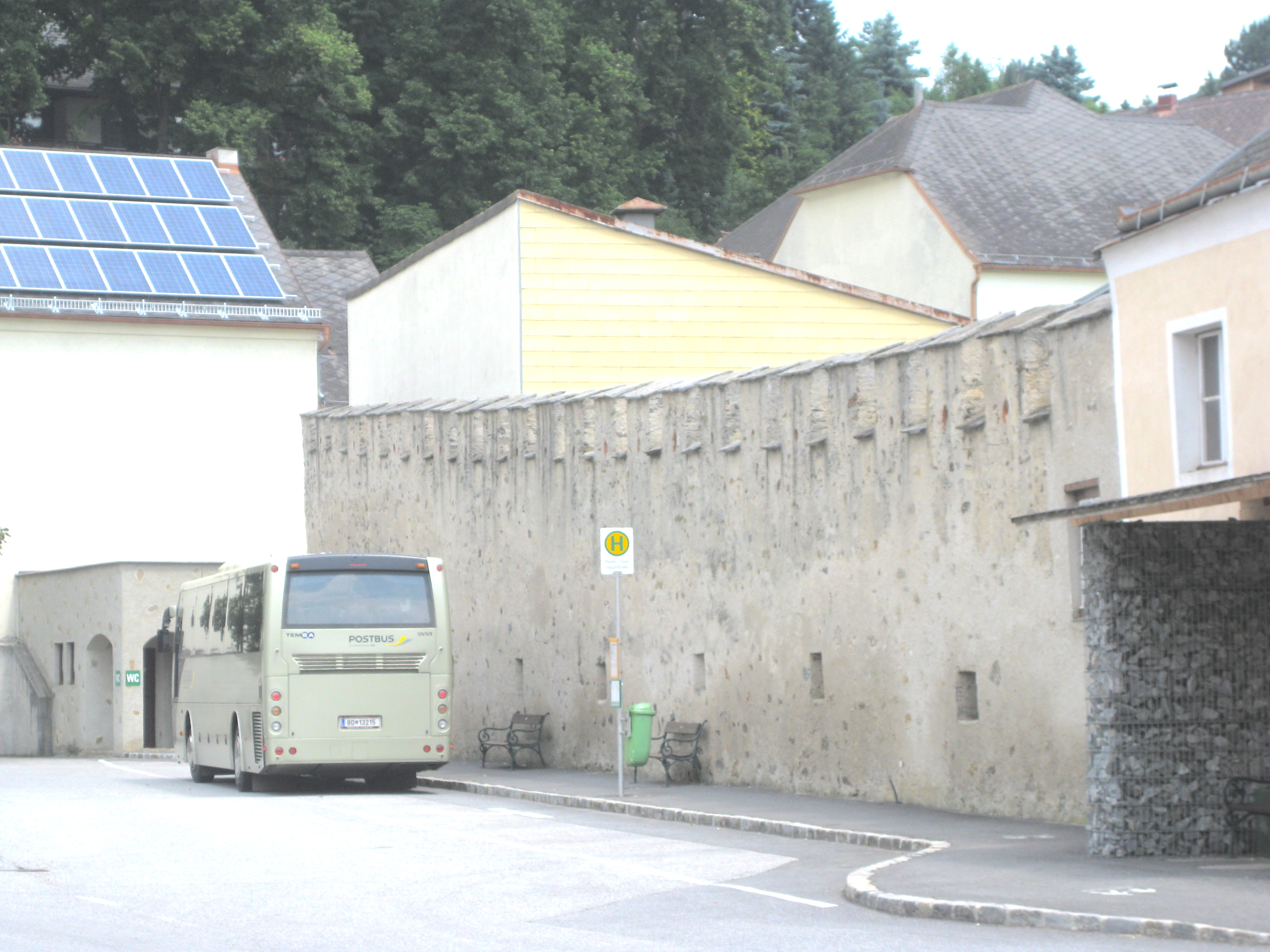
Raabs an der Thaya. Restored length of Town Wall
- Retz was first mentioned around 1180 and the new town was founded by Duke Bechhtold I around 1300.
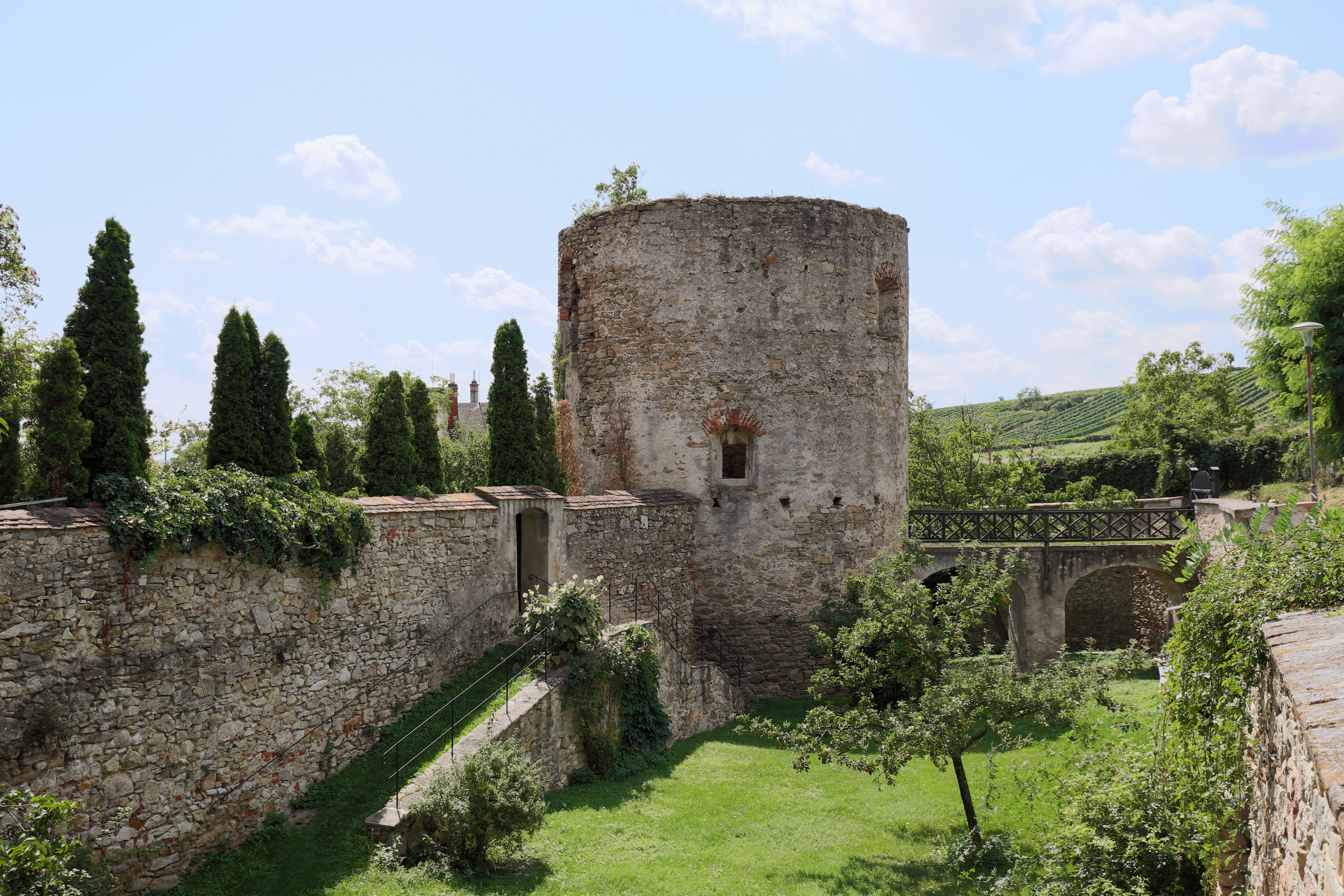
Retz, Haberfelderturm with town wall

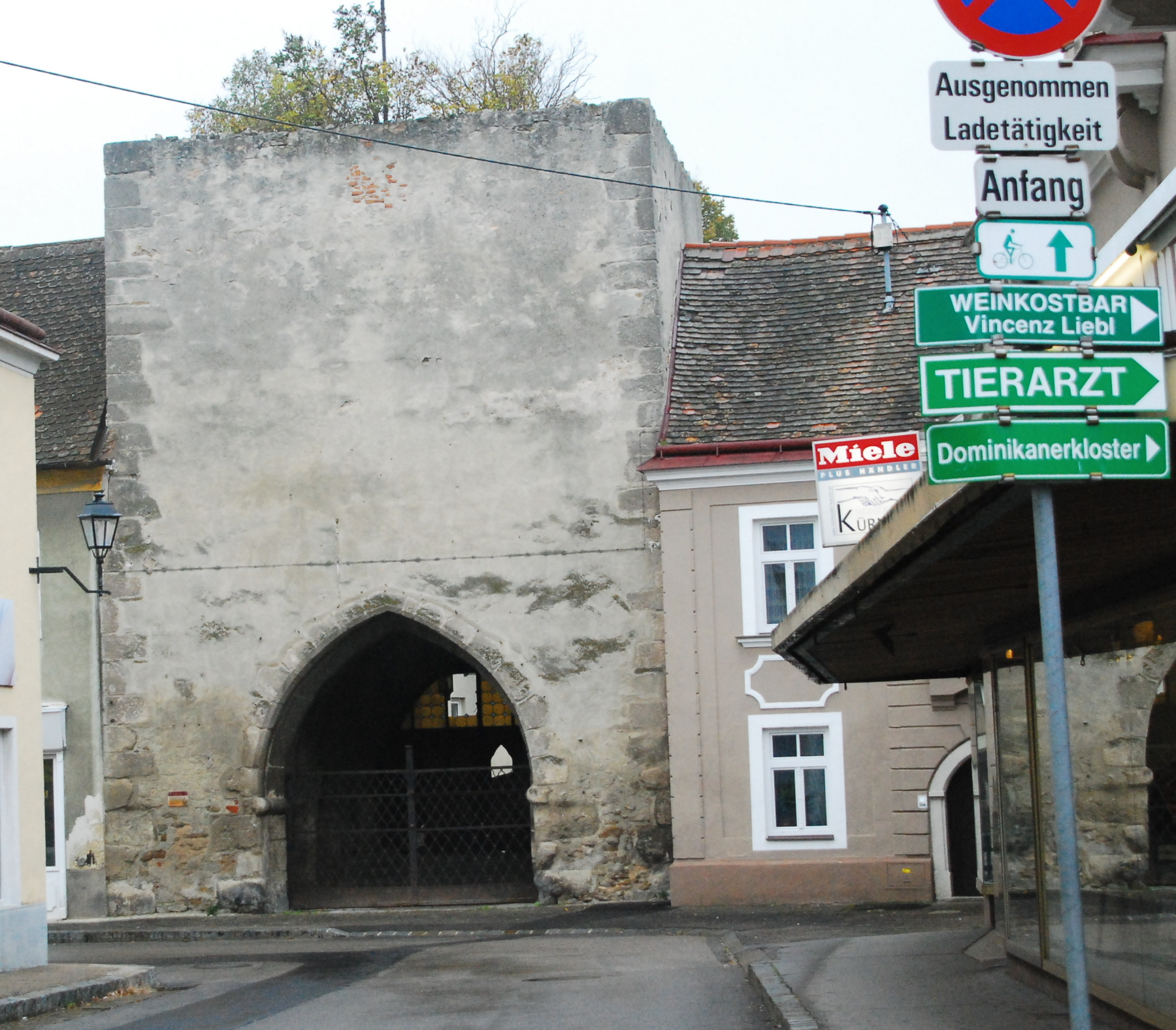
Retz, Nalbertor

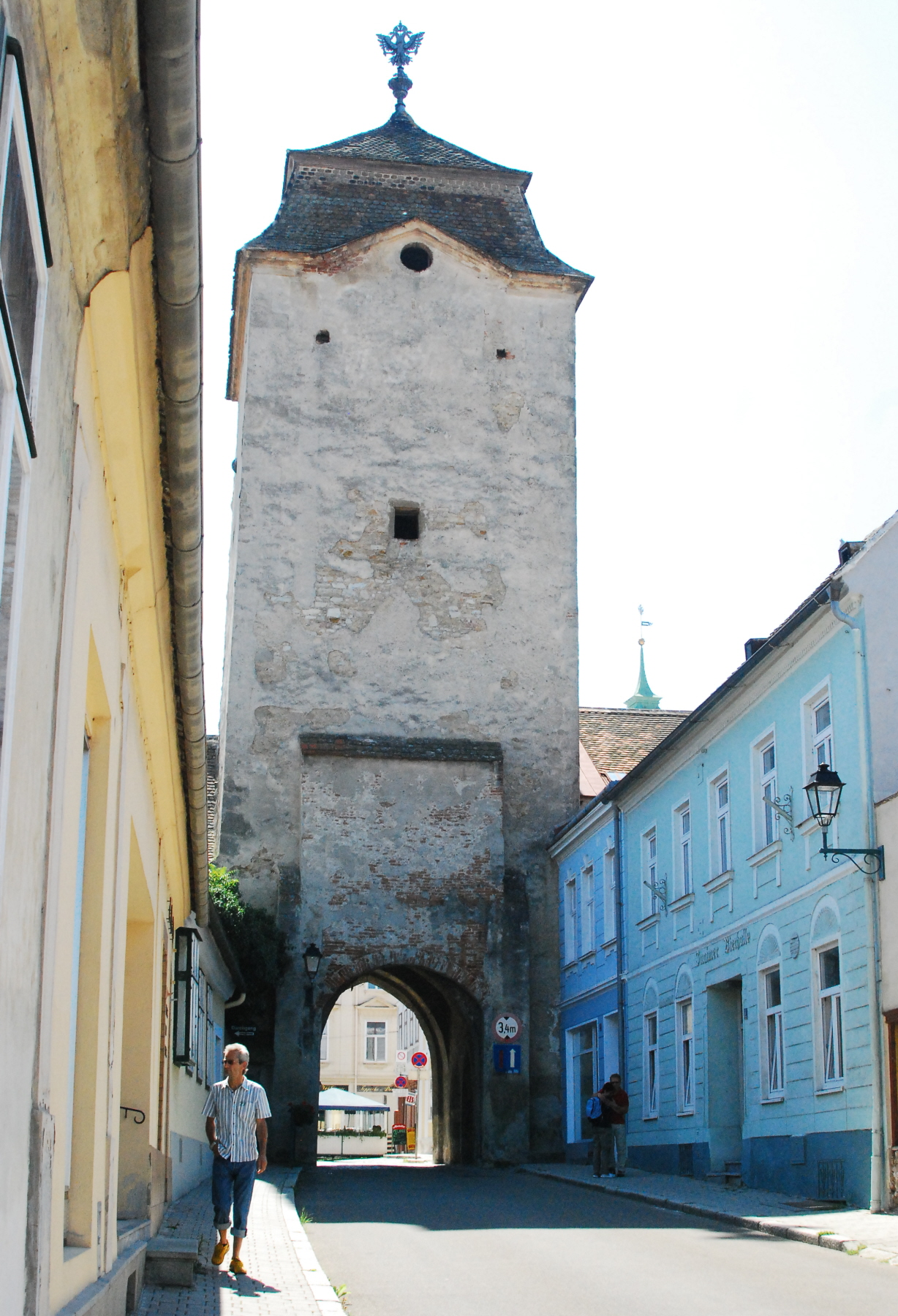
Retz, Znaimertor

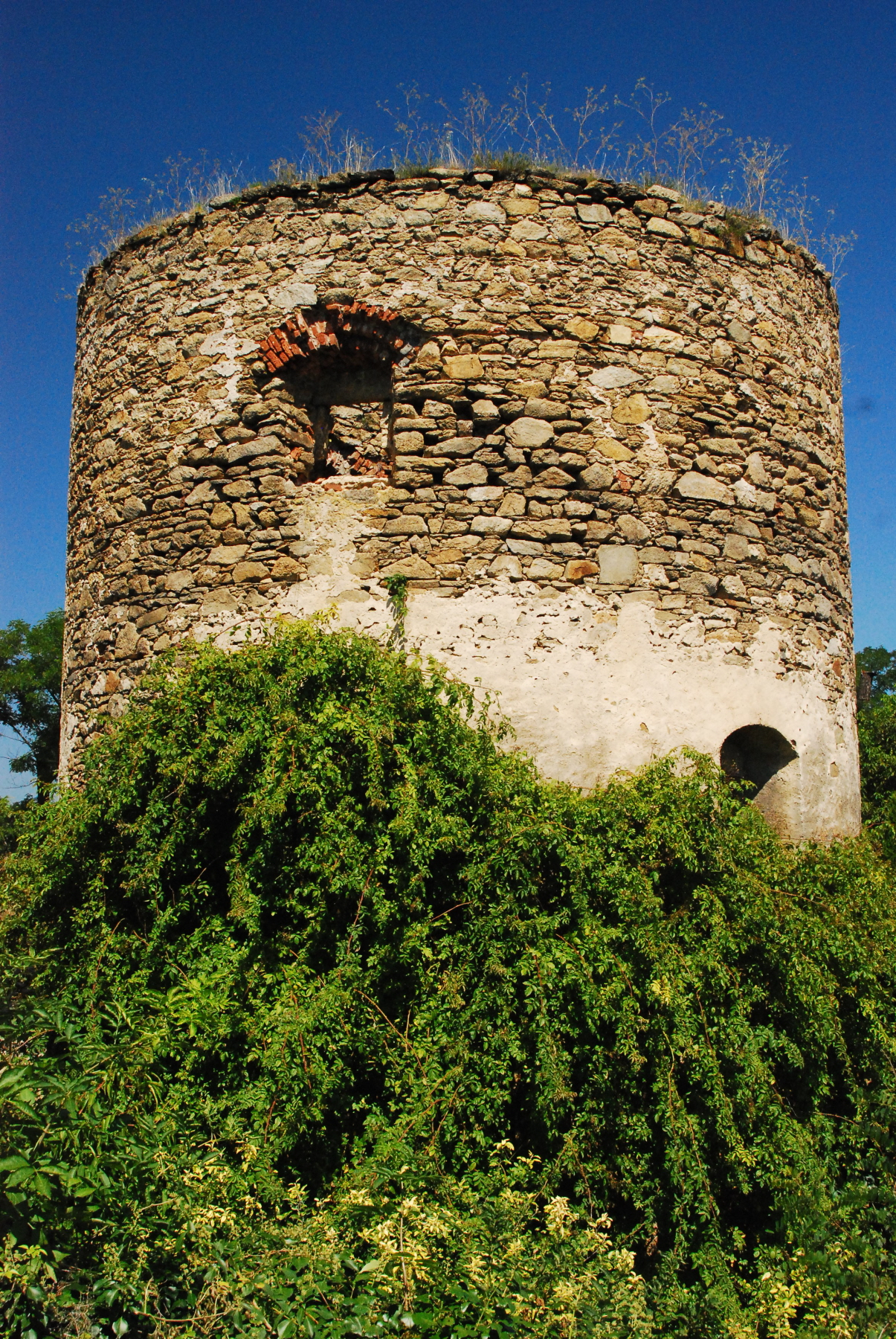
Retz, Haberfelderturm

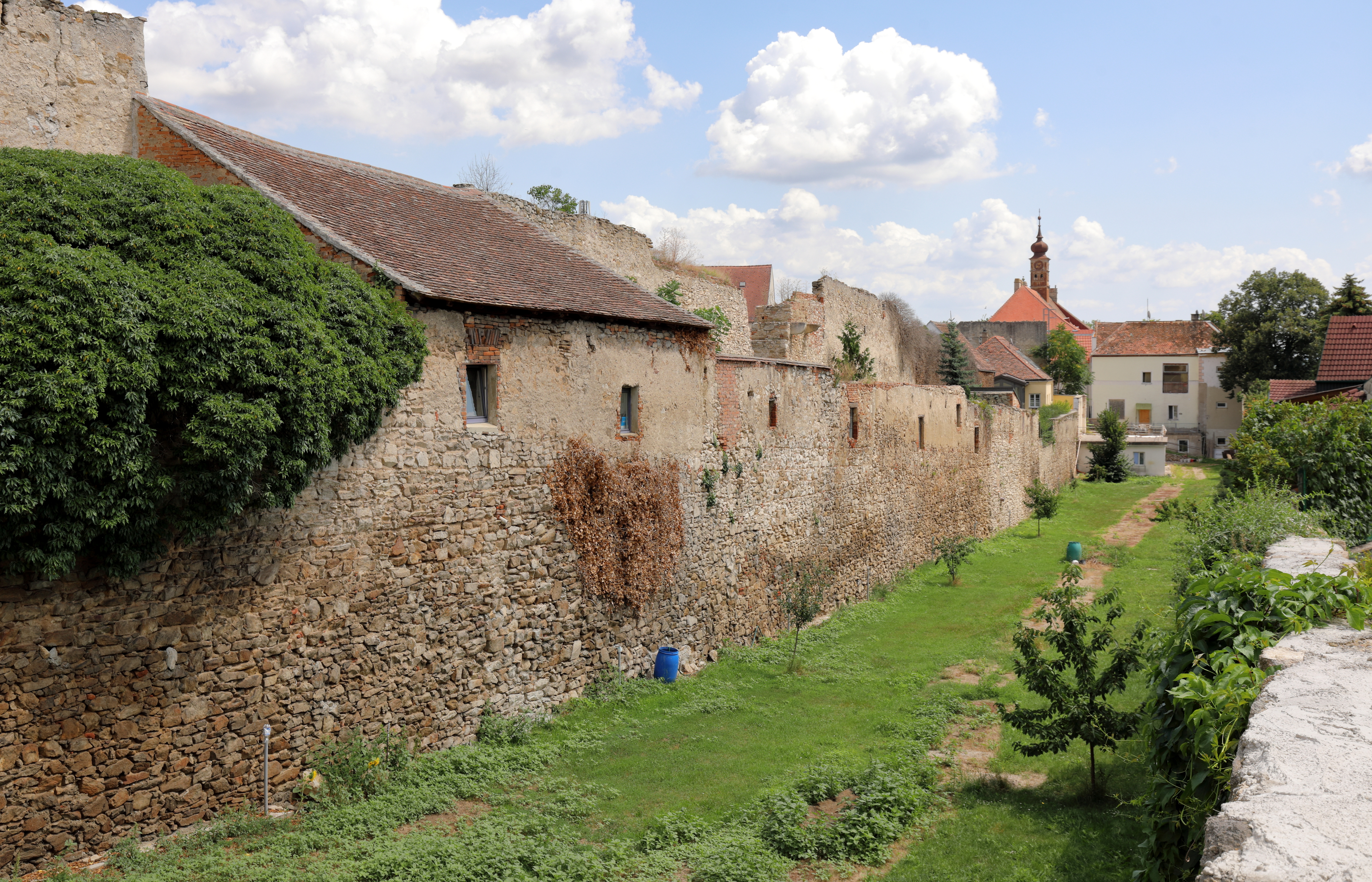
Retz, southside of town wall
- St Pölten was founded as the municipium of 'Aelium Cetium' by Emperor Hadrian in 122 AD. The grid layout of the Roman settlement has survived in the medieval layout, and the Roman defences are likely to be in the same position medieval town walls. First mentioned in 799 as 'Treisma'. A possession of the Bishop of Passau until it was granted to the Habsburg Emperor Maximilian in 1490. Granted Market rights in 1058 and a charter in 1338. It was walled and ditched around 1250. There is a Braun and Hogenburg panoramic print of 1600, and a very similar print of 1649/1679 by Merian. These prints show that the wall had regularly spaced gun casemates and in front of this was a low crenellated wall with round towers. There is a large-shaped artillery bastion. The gate-tower is shown with barbican defence works in front.
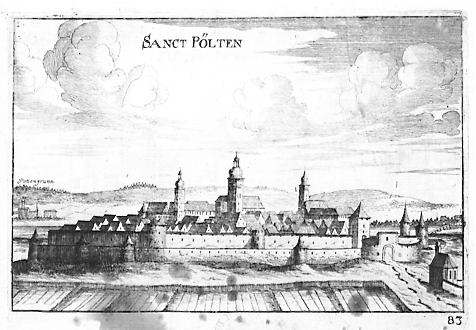
St Pölten, Lower Austria by Georg Mätthaus Vischer in 1672

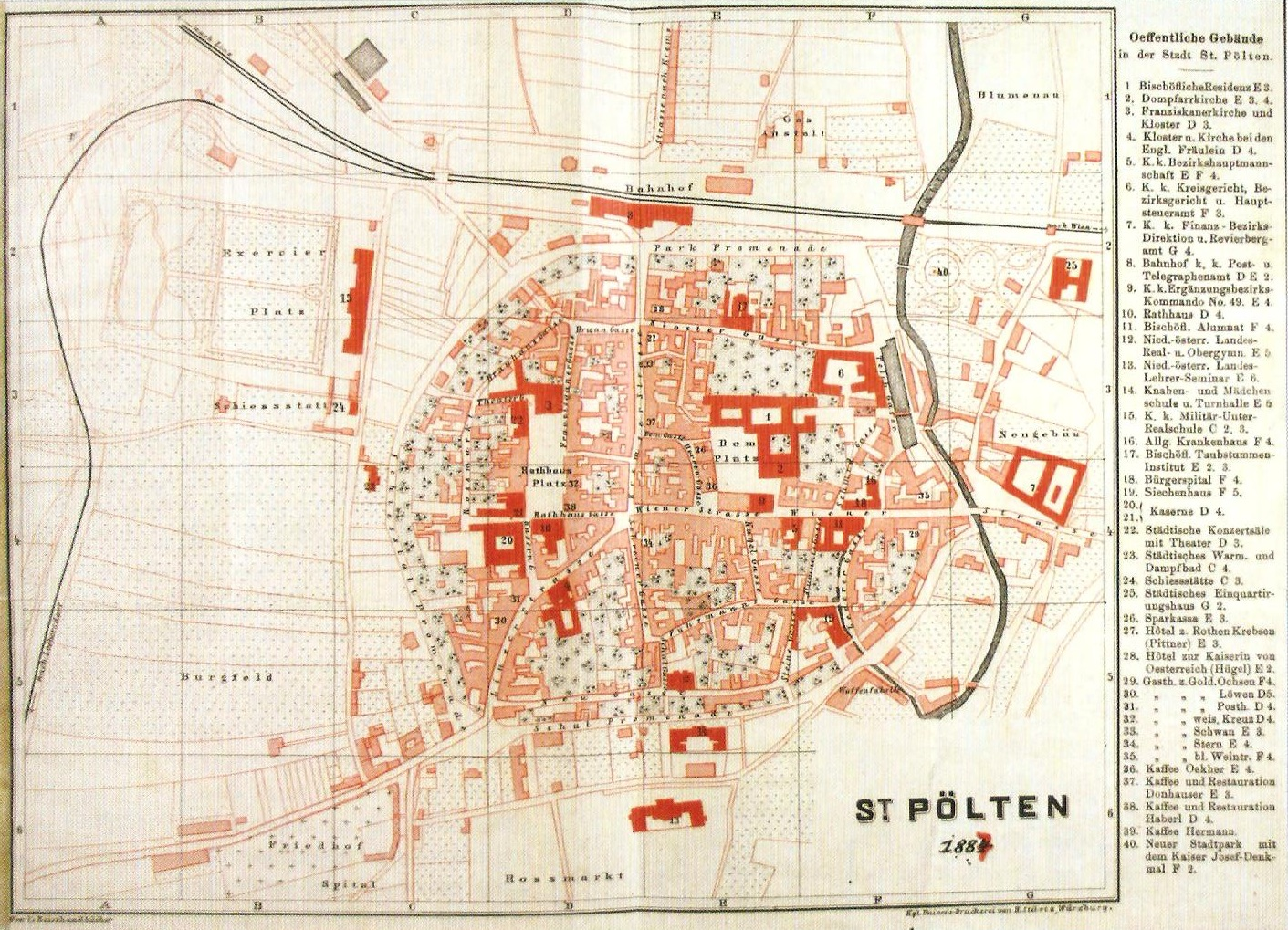
St. Pölten, Stadtplan 1887

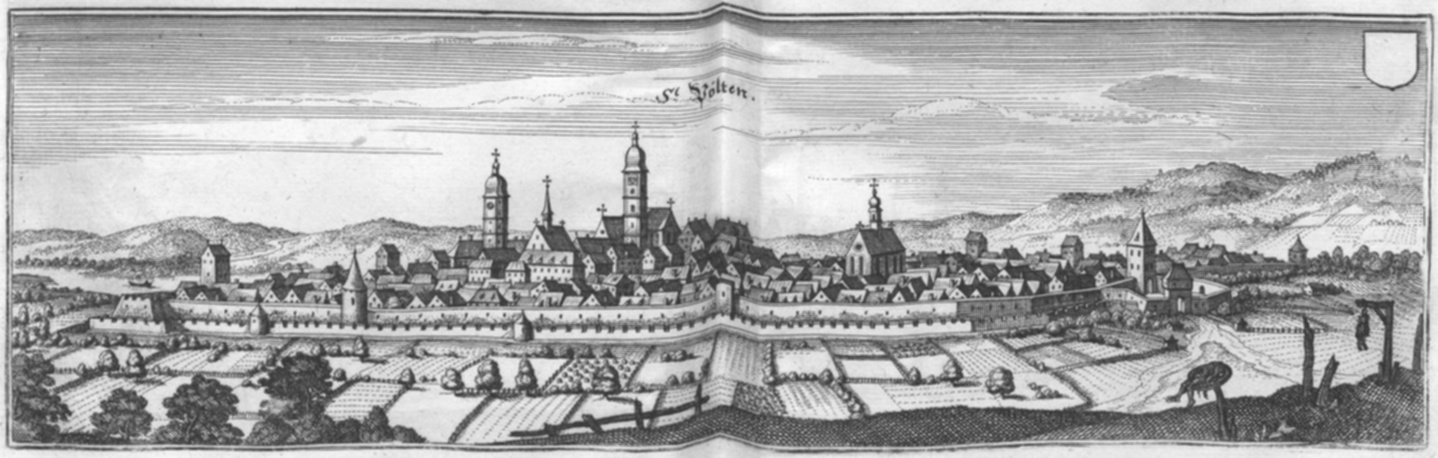
S. Pölten (Merian) 1679

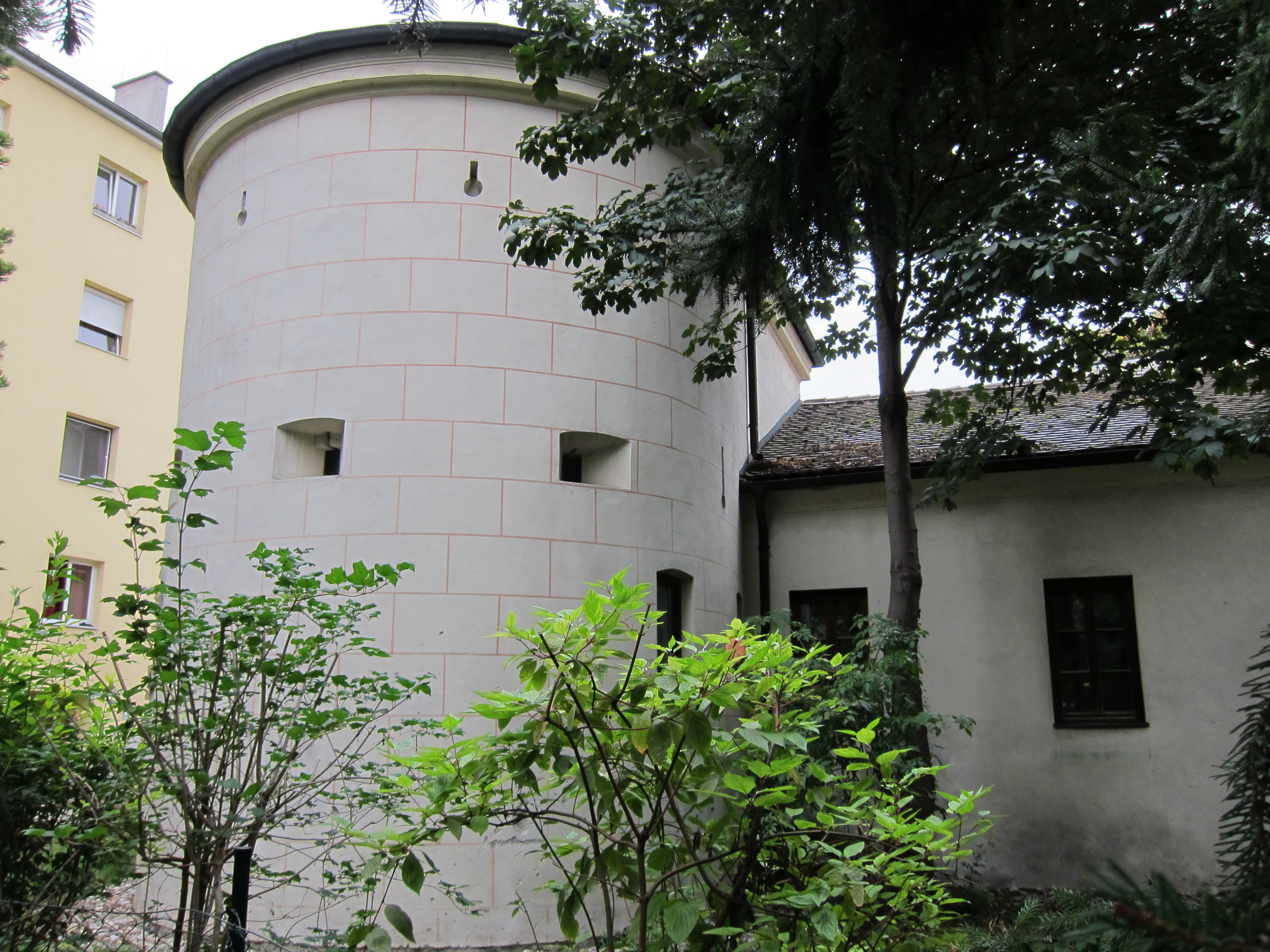
Turm der Stadtbefestigung und Reste der Stadtmauer Dr. Karl Renner Promenade

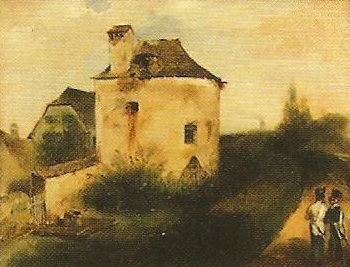
F. Treml, Stadtmauer um 1840

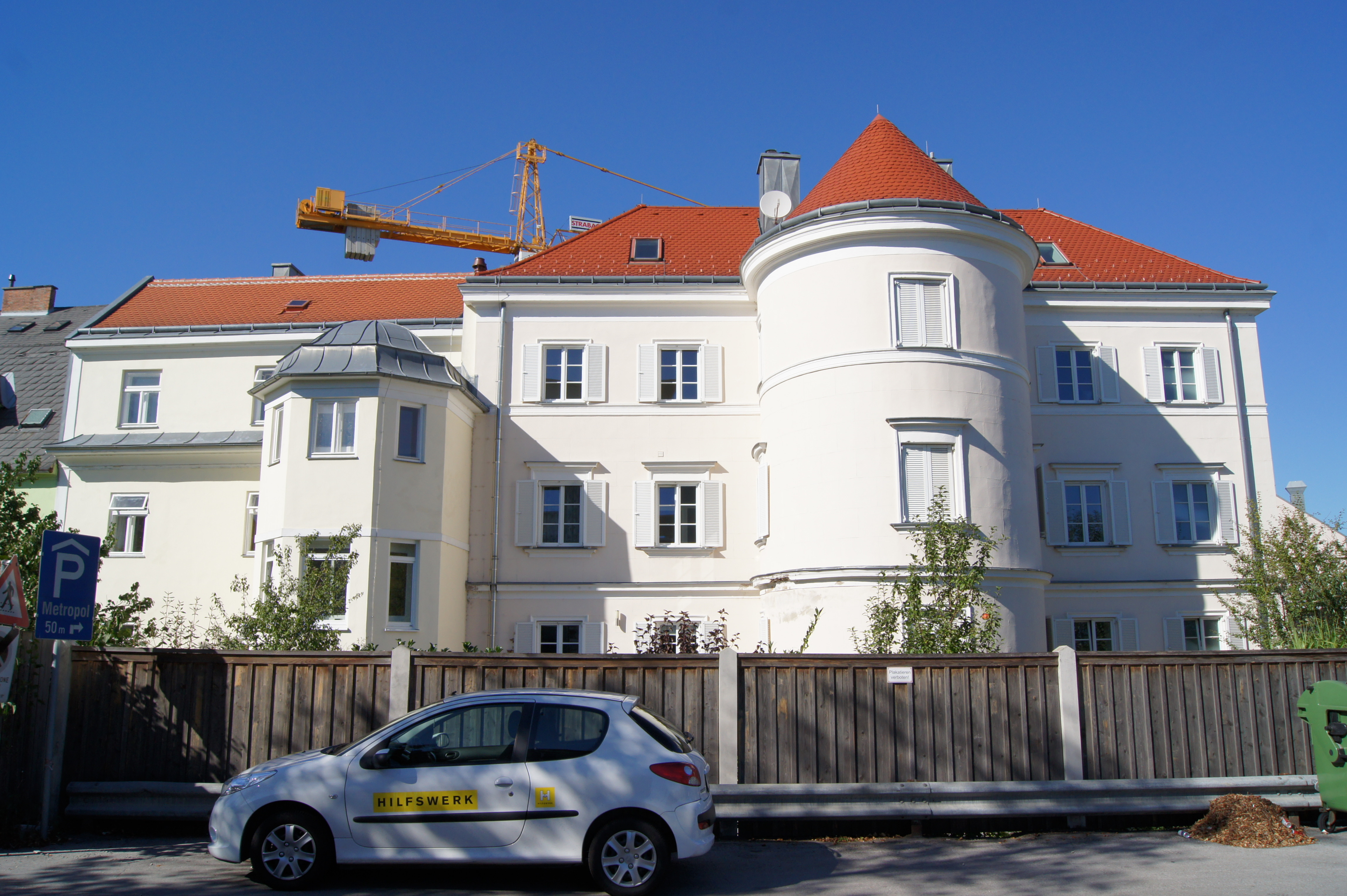
Dr. Karl Renner-Promenade

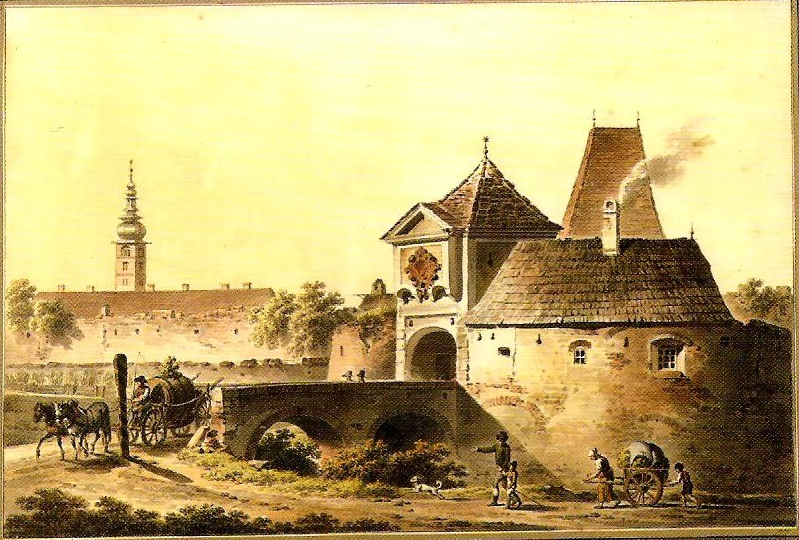
Kremsertor um 1810
- Scheibbs. The town fronts the river Erlauf. The older area of settlement was in the area of castle and this was extended northwards around 1120. In 1160 the town was held by Otto de Schibis from the Graf Conrad of Peilstein. Otto de Schibis laid out the area of Oberer Markt. From 1218 the town was granted to the Carthusian Abbey of Gaming, who further developed the town, and expanded N, up to the Ginningbach rivulet. From 1218 the town was granted to the Carthusian Abbey of Gaming, who further developed the town, and expanded N, diverting the Ginningbach and laying out the long rectangular ‘Unterer Markt’. A market charter was granted in 1338, and between 1349 and 1342 the Abbey enclosed the town with walls. In 1352 Duke Albrecht II granted the town a charter. Originally there were five gate towers and thirteen towers on the wall. The earliest tower, which was the Pulverturm, built in 1360 and was presumably a blockhouse for mounting artillery. Three gate-towers survive and a number of round towers. The town resisted a Turkish siege in probably 1523.
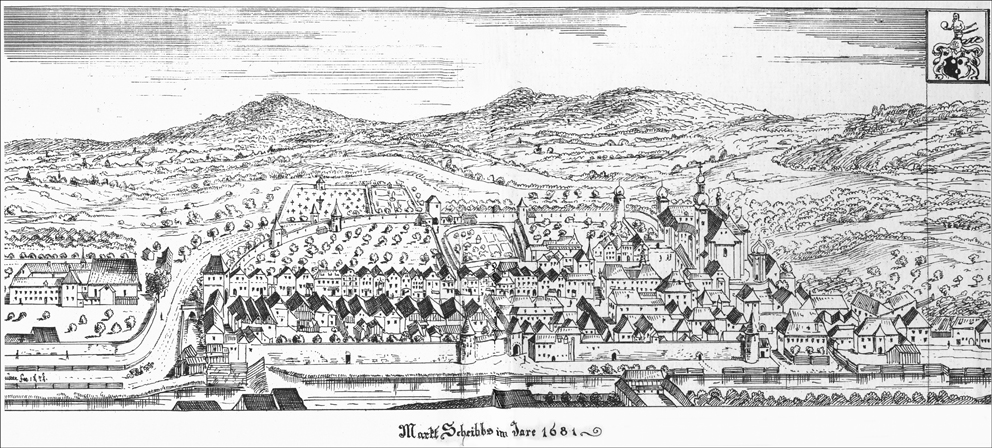
Scheibbs in 1681

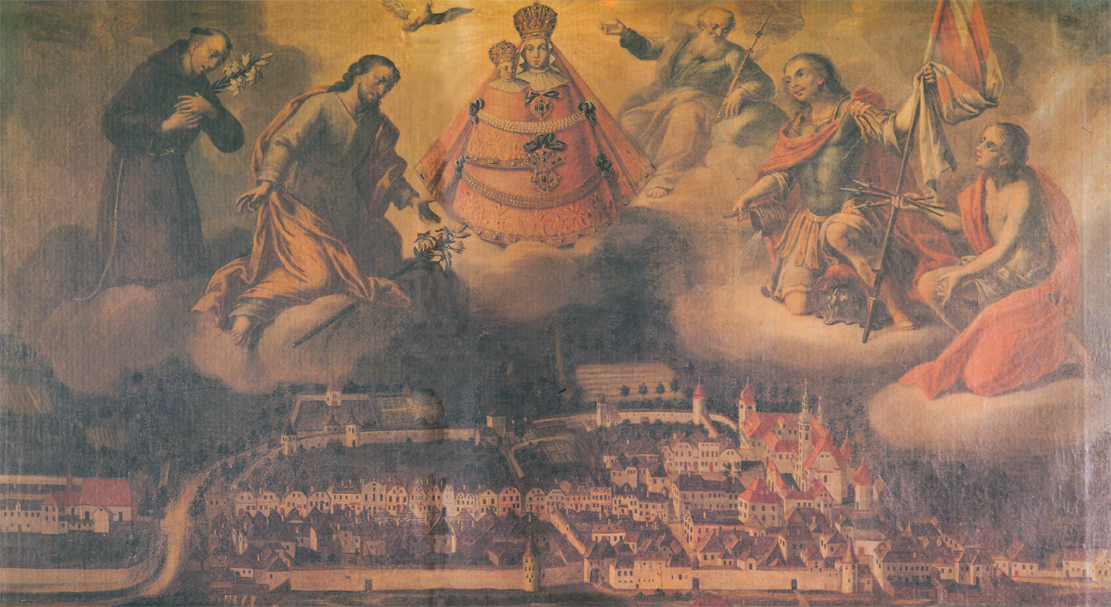
Scheibbs 1681–1764 Painting in Stift Gaming

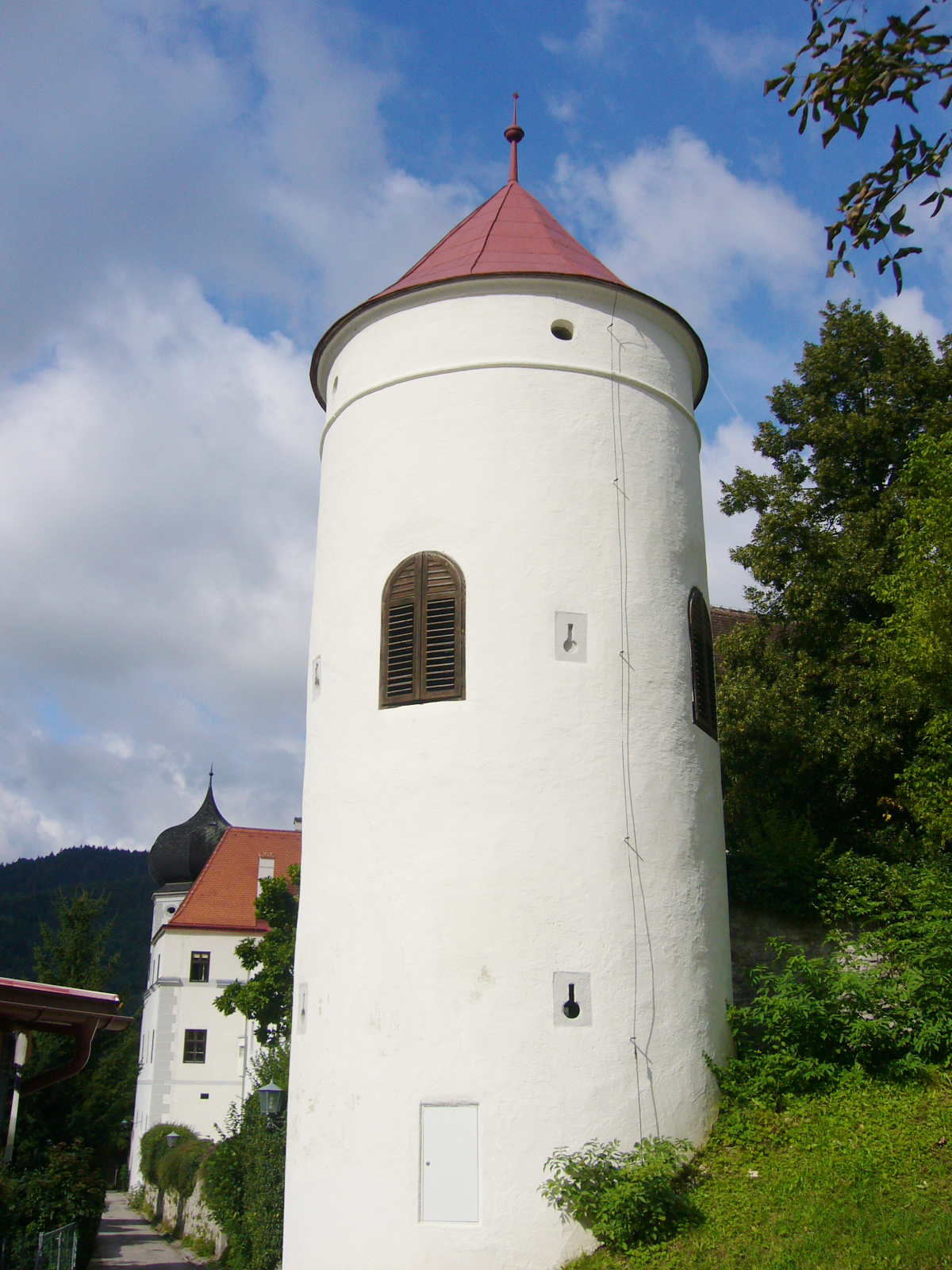
Scheibbs-Schöllgrabenturm

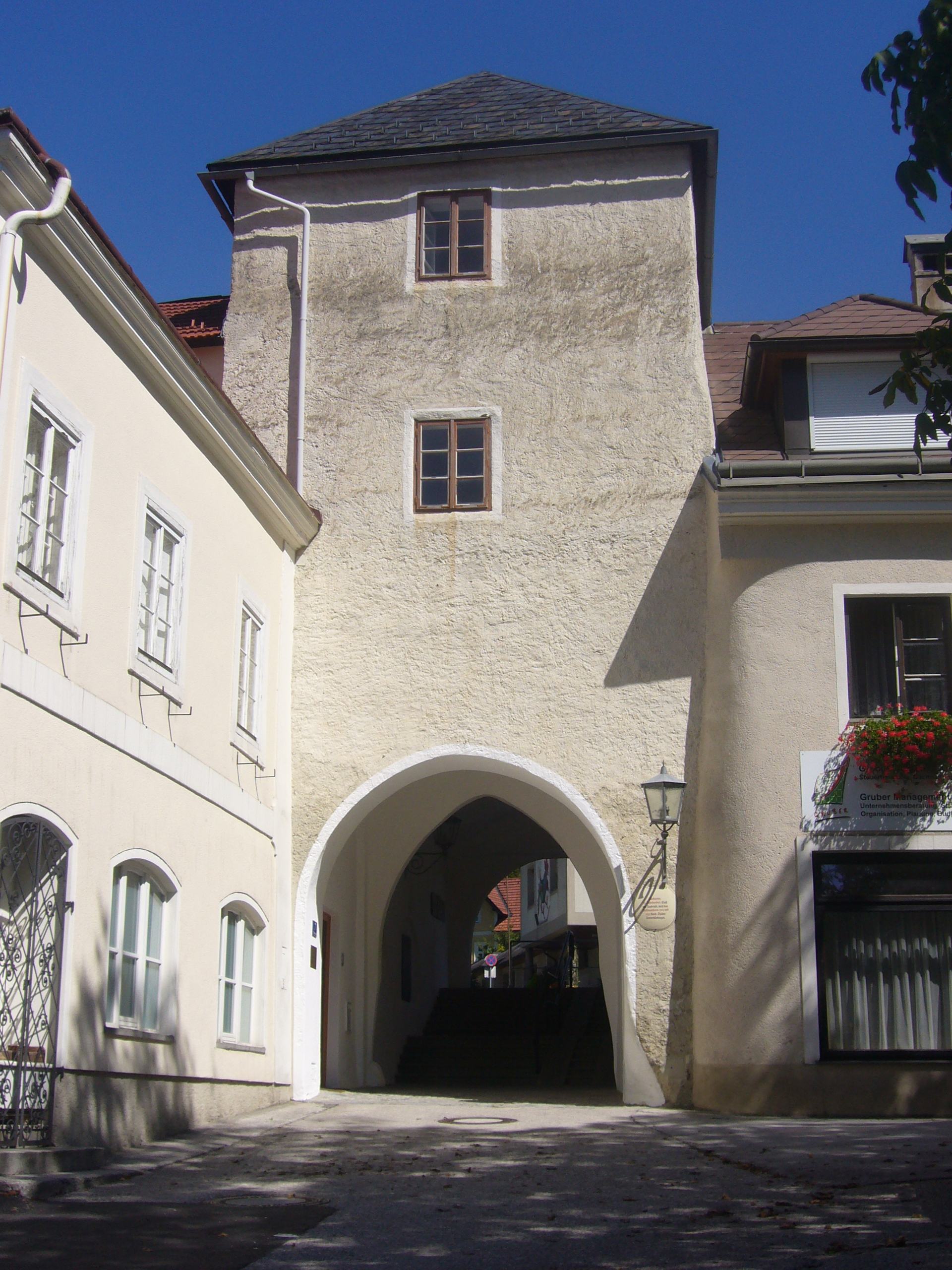
Flecknertor Scheibbs

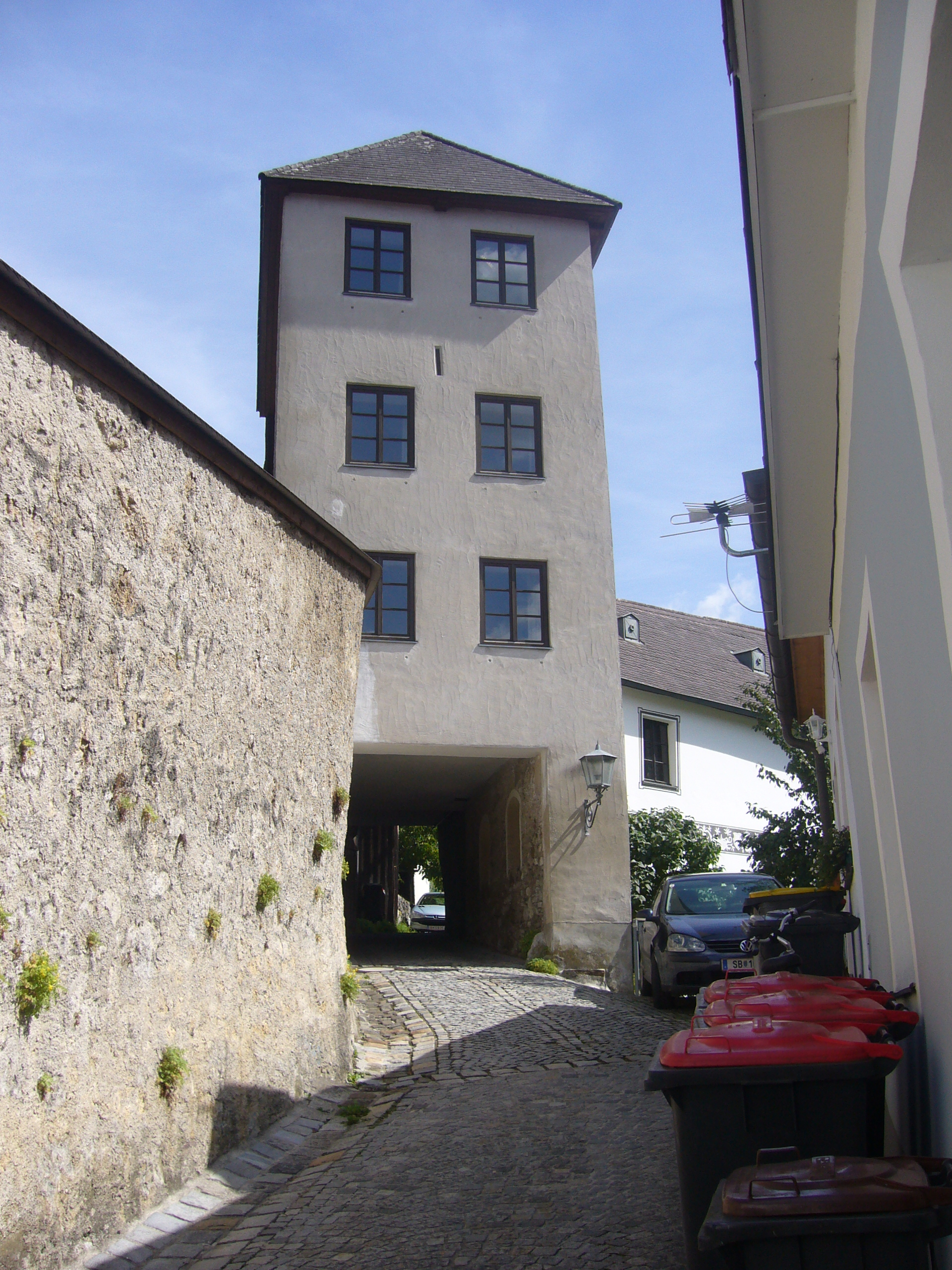
Burgerhoftor Scheibbs

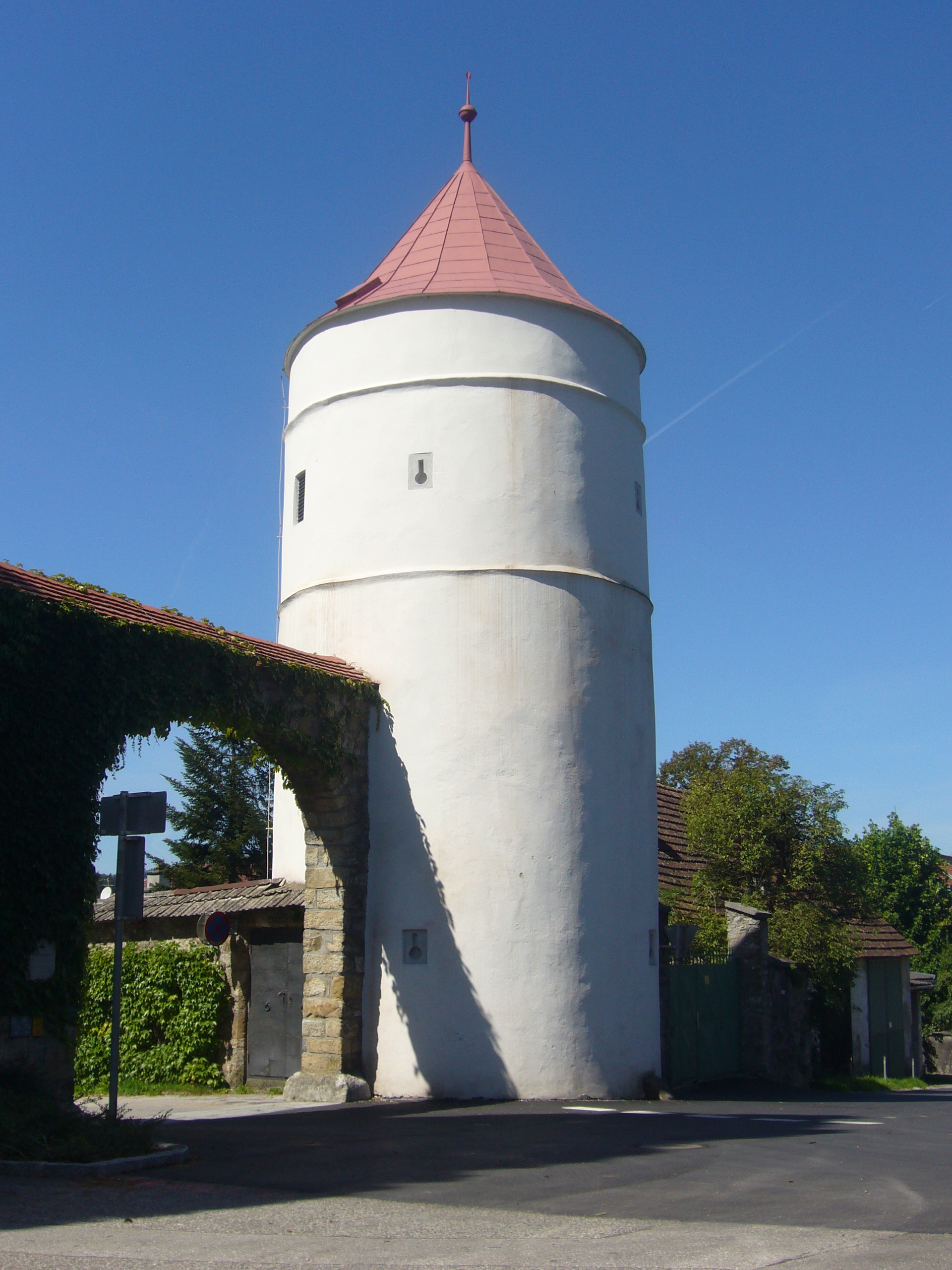
Zwinger tower, Burgerhofstraße, Scheibbs
- Schrattenthal was first mentioned in 1220. Besieged and captured by the Hussites in 1445. Ulrich Eitzing appears to have re-fortified the town, which was granted a market in 1438, and a charter in 1472. Long rectangular marketplace. Fragments of towers and walls remain on the north side and the Stadt Tor gateway survives on the SE.
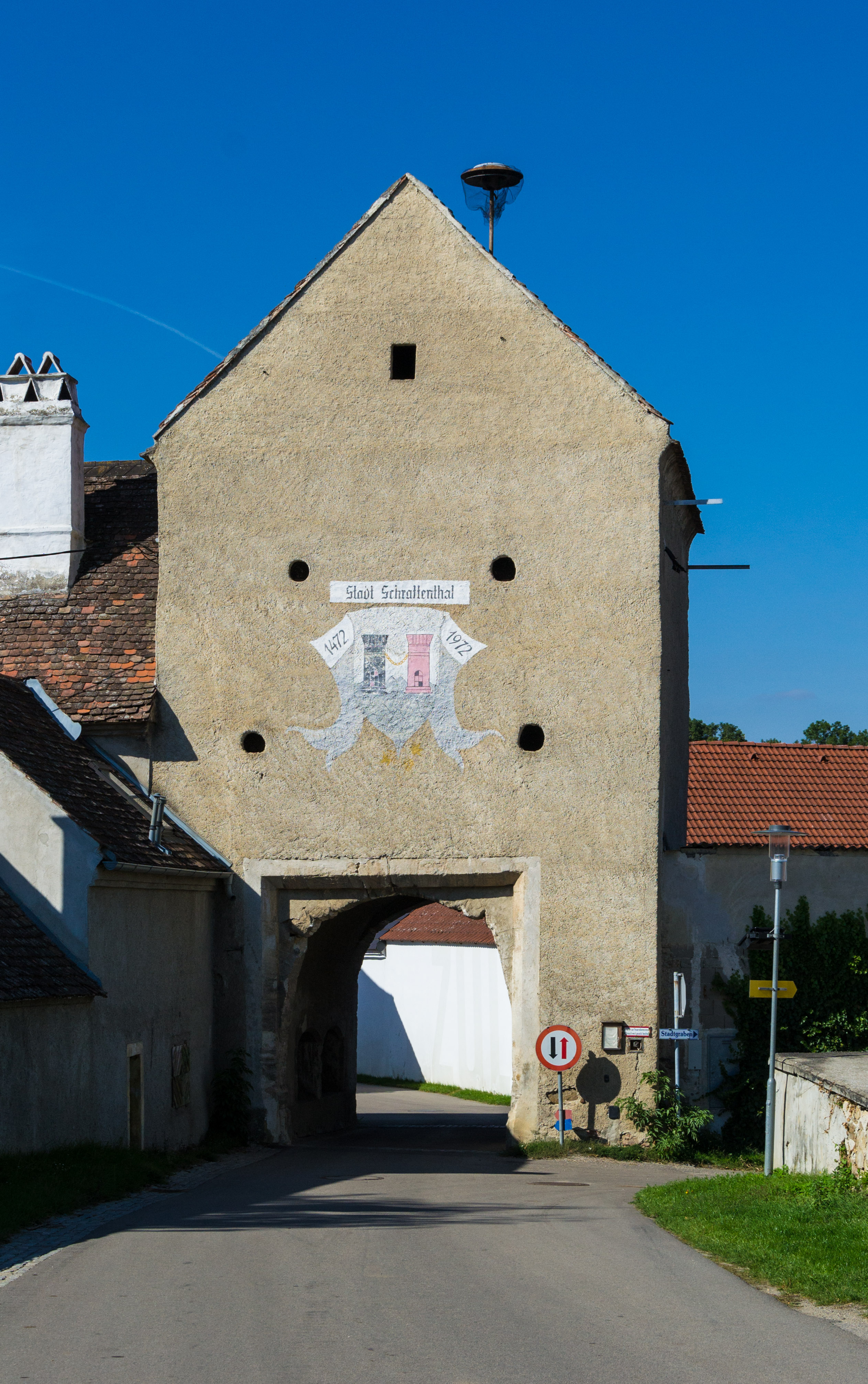
Eggenburger Tor, Schrattenthal

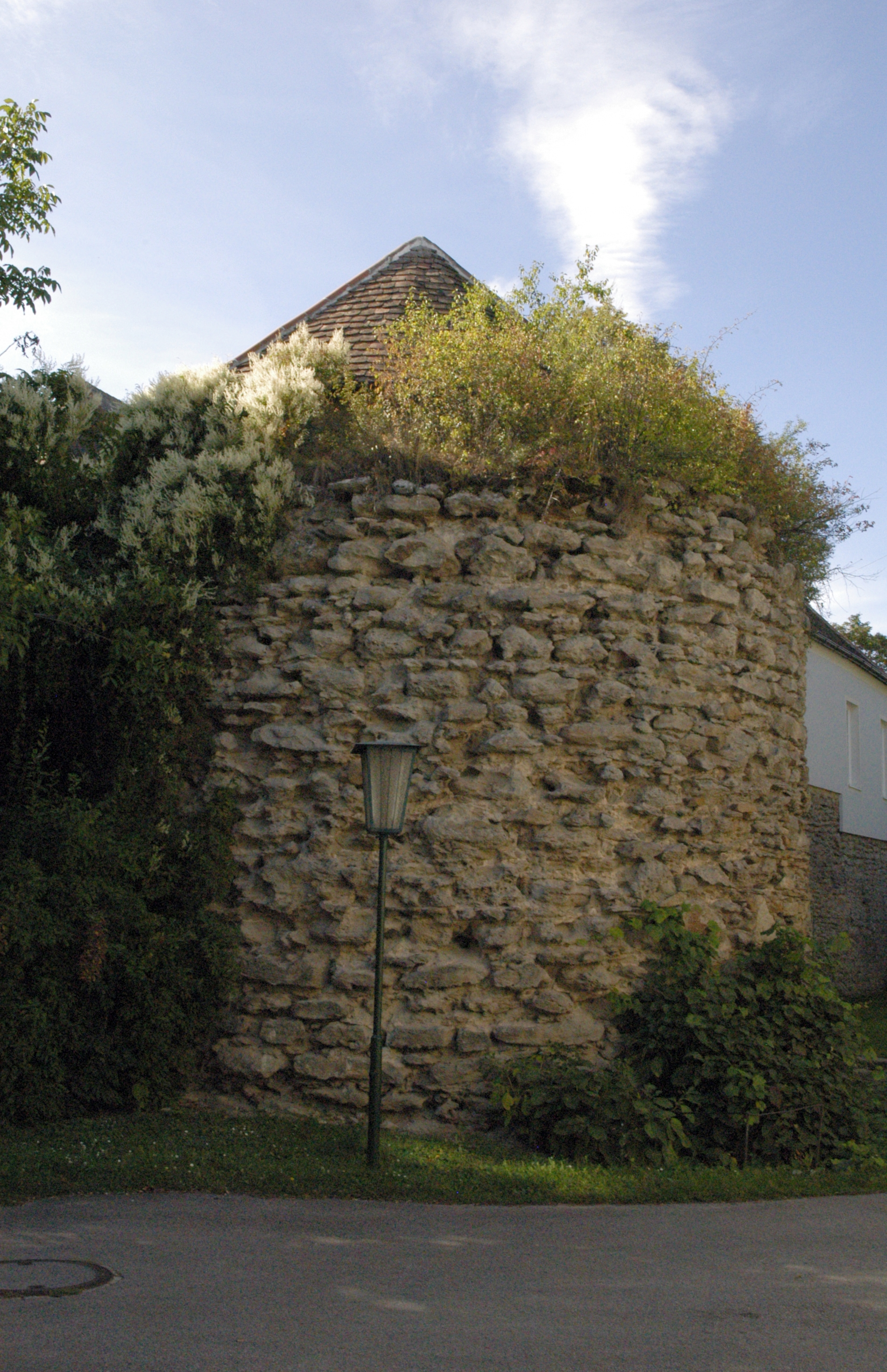
Schrattenthal tower

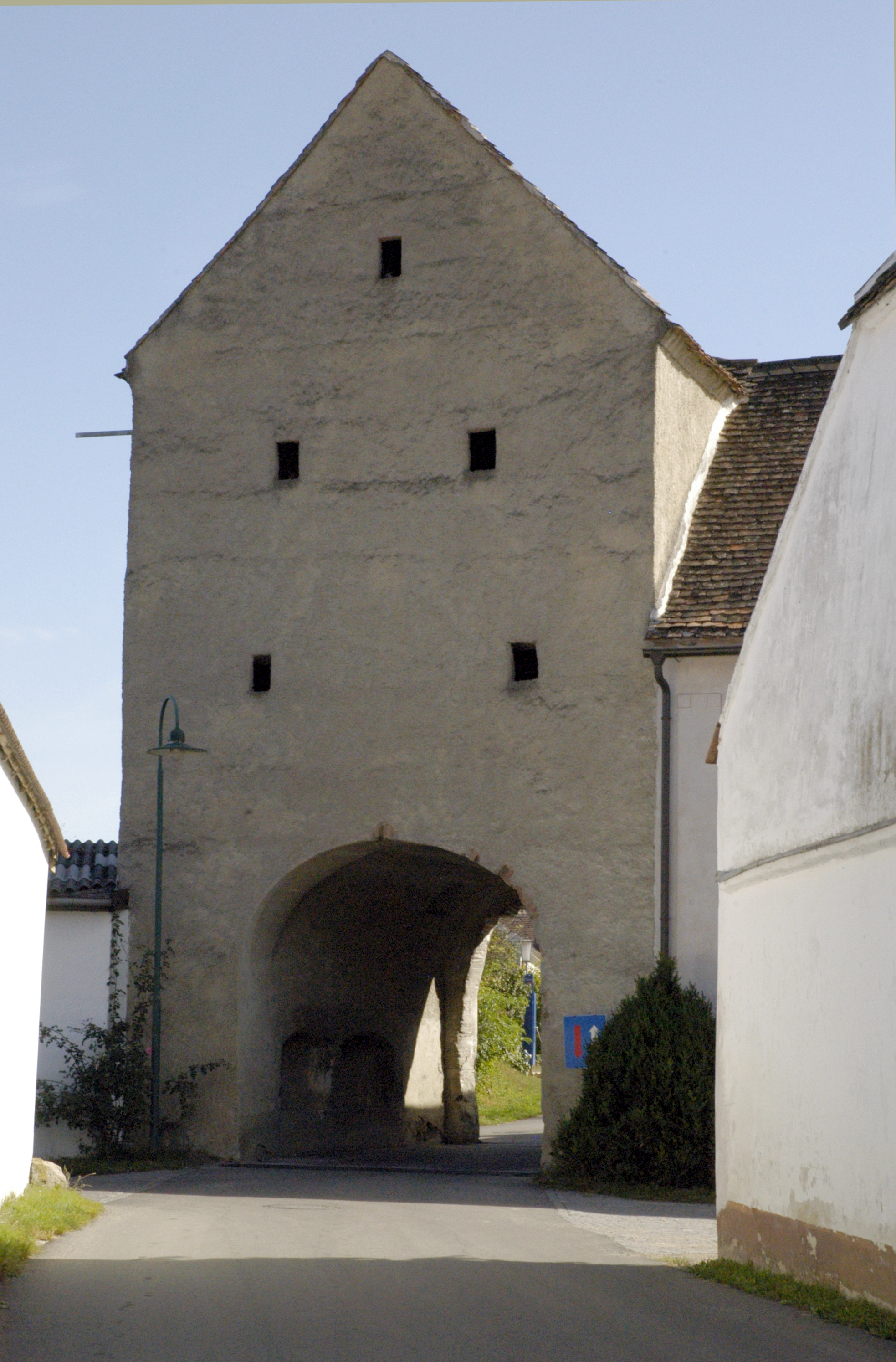
Schrattenthal Stadtbefestigung

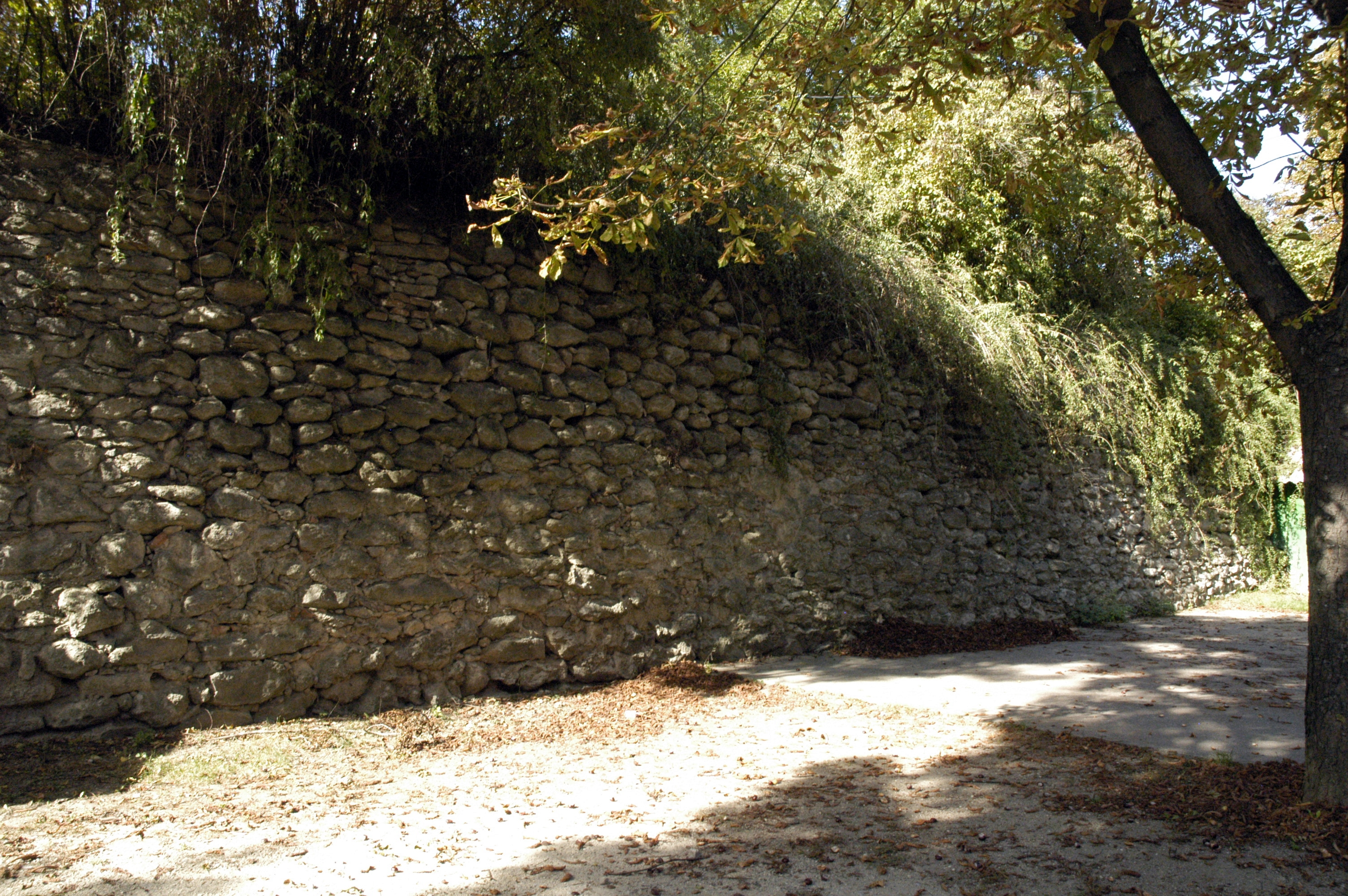
Schrattenthal Stadtbefestigung
- Stein appears to have its origins in the 9th century AD. From the 11th century Stein developed as a Customs Collection centre on the Danube under the Babenbergs. In 1305 it was granted a joint charter with Krems – which is immediately to the east – and in 1463 a bridge across the Danube was built joining it with Mautern. Stein is a long settlement stretching from the river Alaun on the east to the Danube bridge on the W. Merian’s print of 1679 shows an almost rectangular walled settlement, but with a circular extension to the north to take in the Frauenburg, which was the area of the original settlement. Merian shows numerous round towers set into the wall and fragments of two of these may survive in the area of the Rathaus Platz. The walls had been extended when the Danube bridge was built and Merian shows two gate-towers on the road leading out to the Wachau in the W-one of the gates, the Wachau Tor survives. There was a bridgehead tower, the Mauterner Tor, set in the wall extension, which was demolished in the 19th century. Stretches of wall remain on the north and west and there are a number of square towers, A further gate-tower, the Kremser Tor survives in the E.
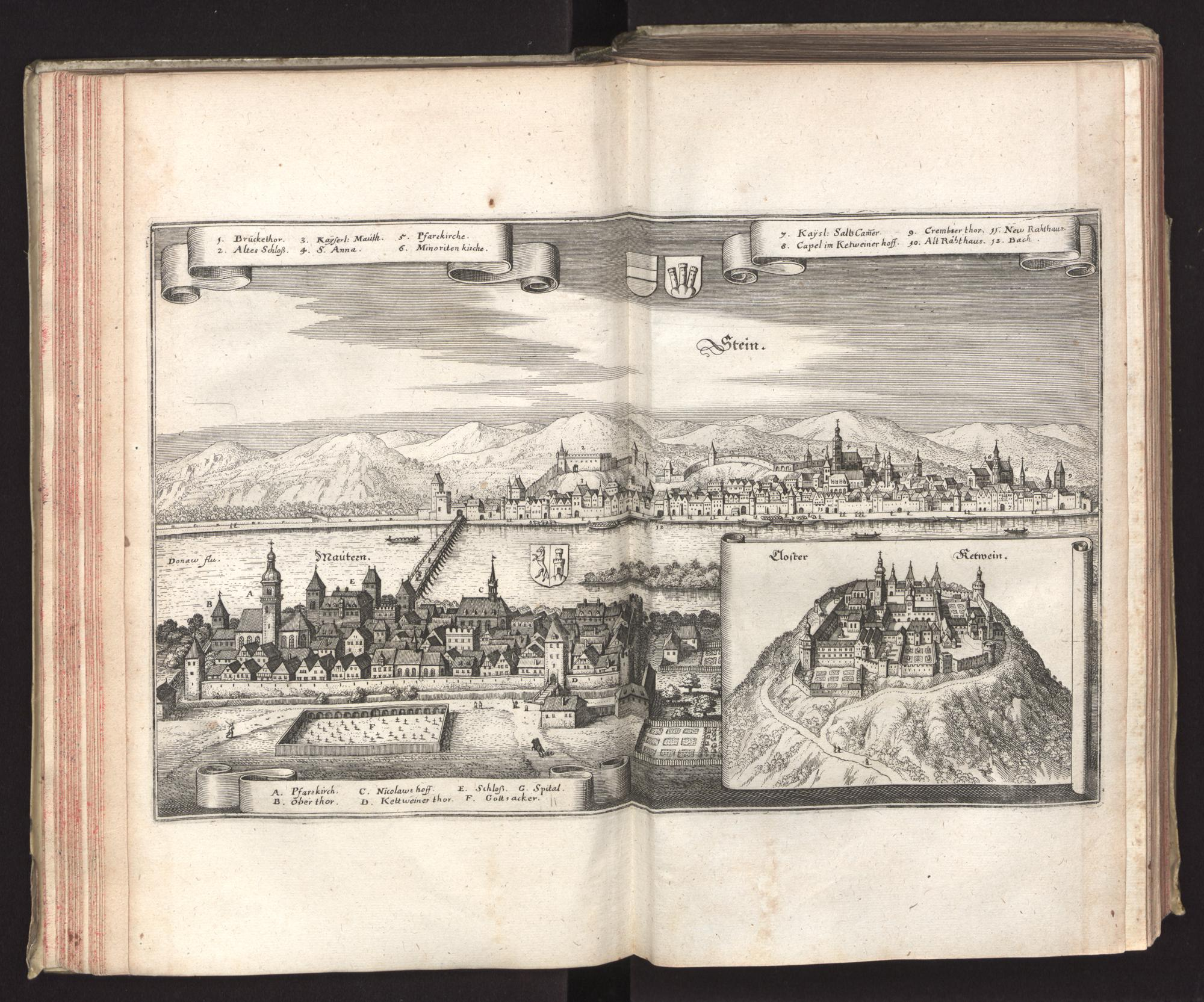
Topographia Austriacarum (Merian) 1679

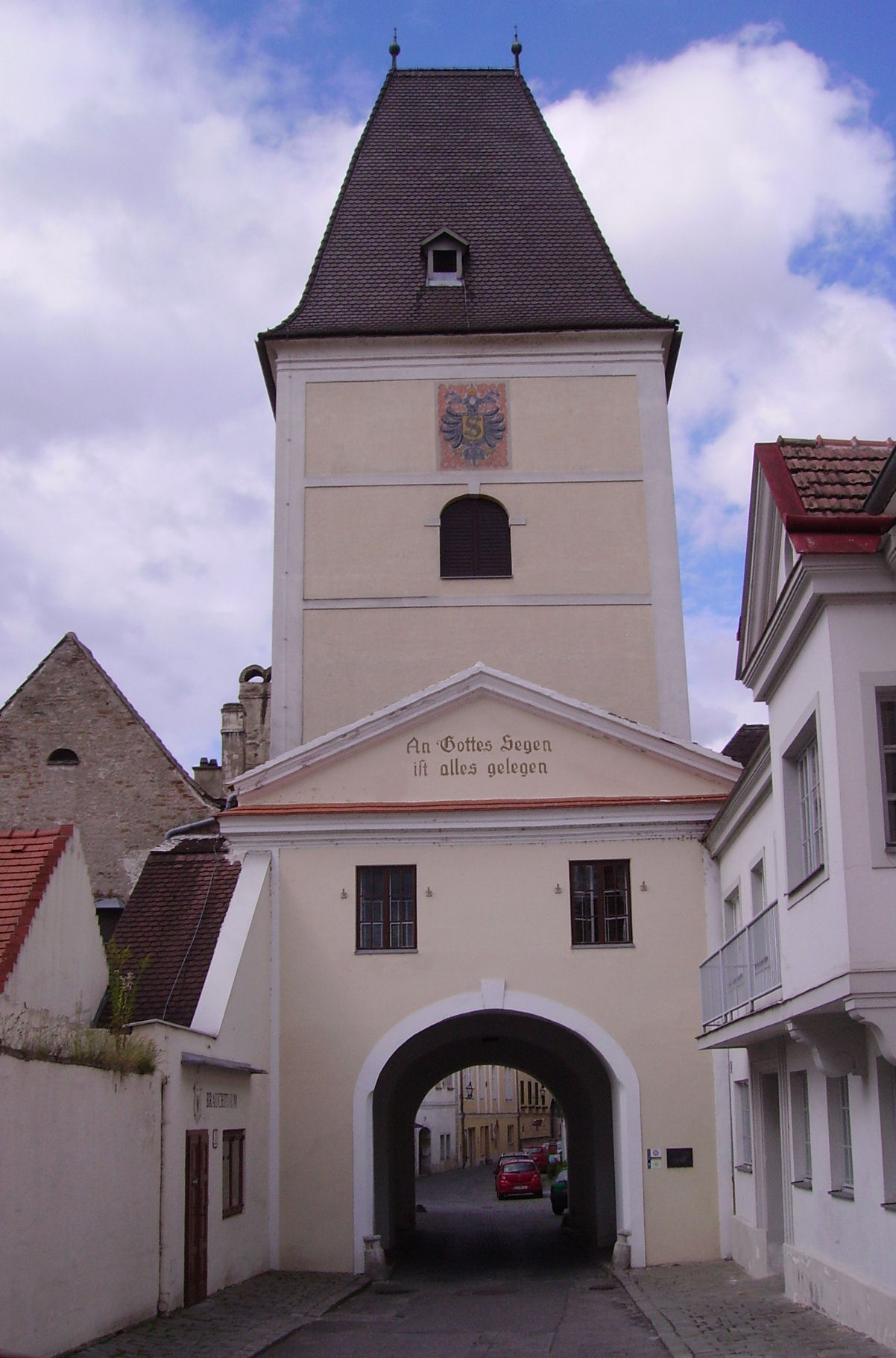
Stadttor von Stein

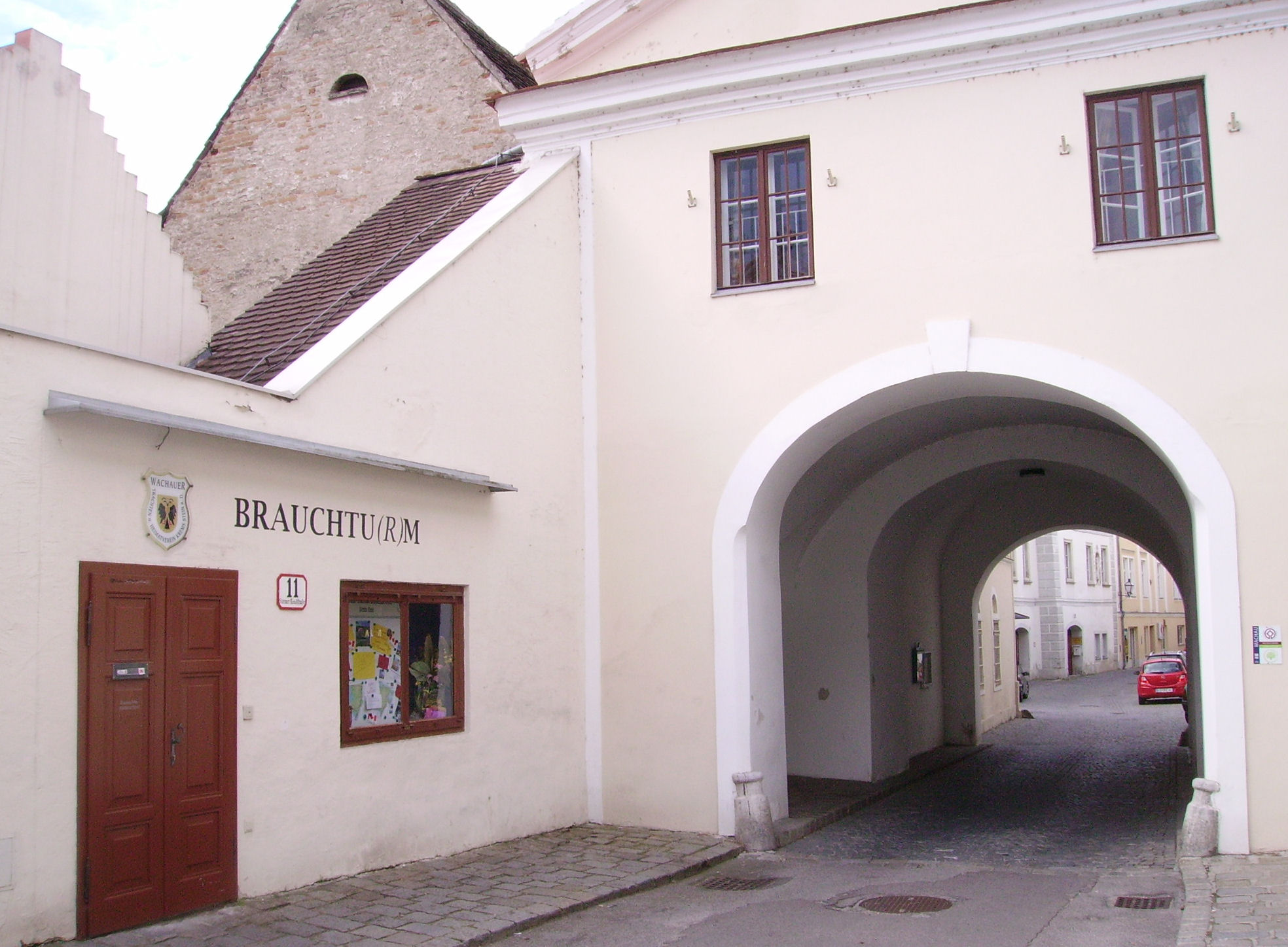
Stadttor von Stein

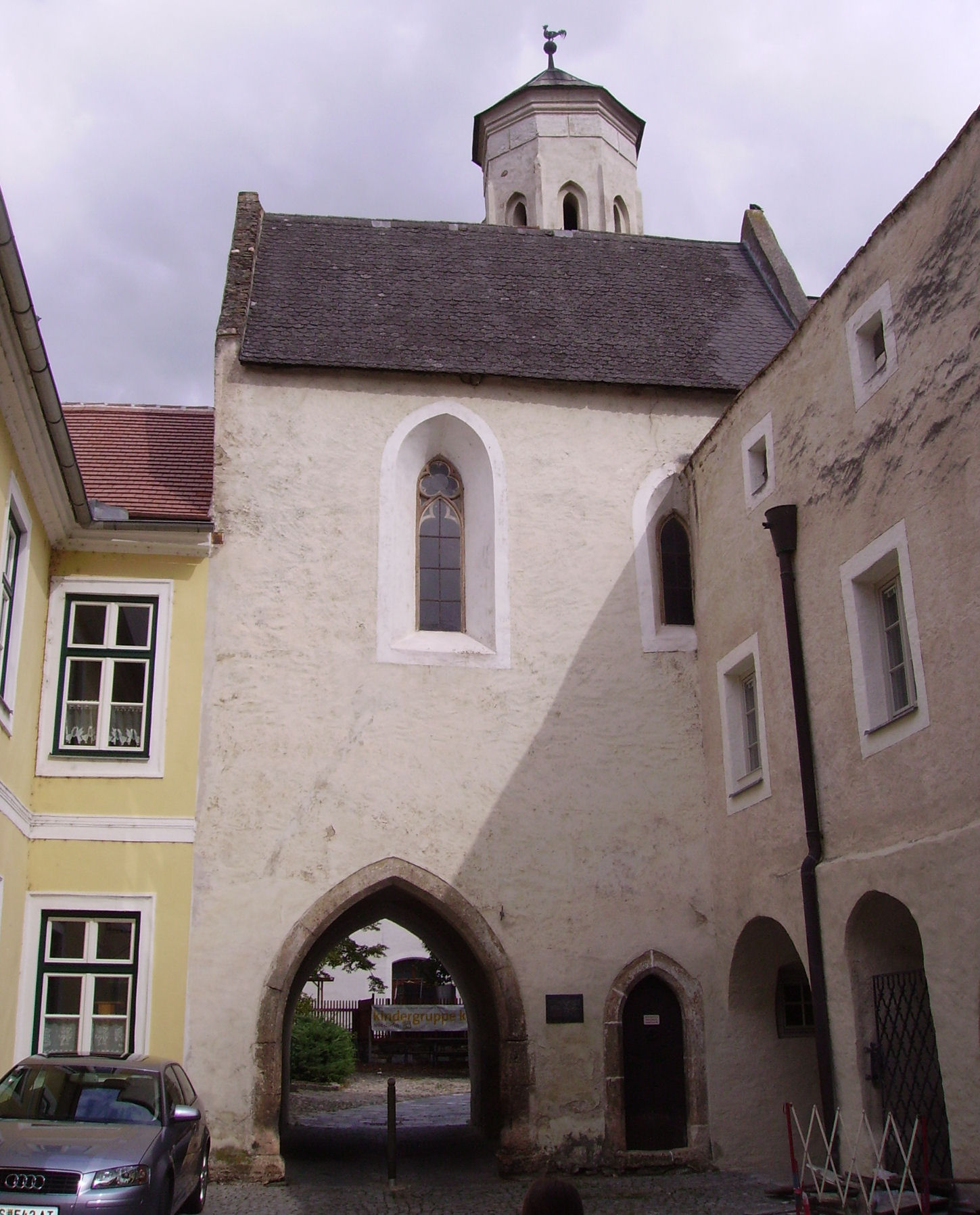
Tor in Stein (Krems)

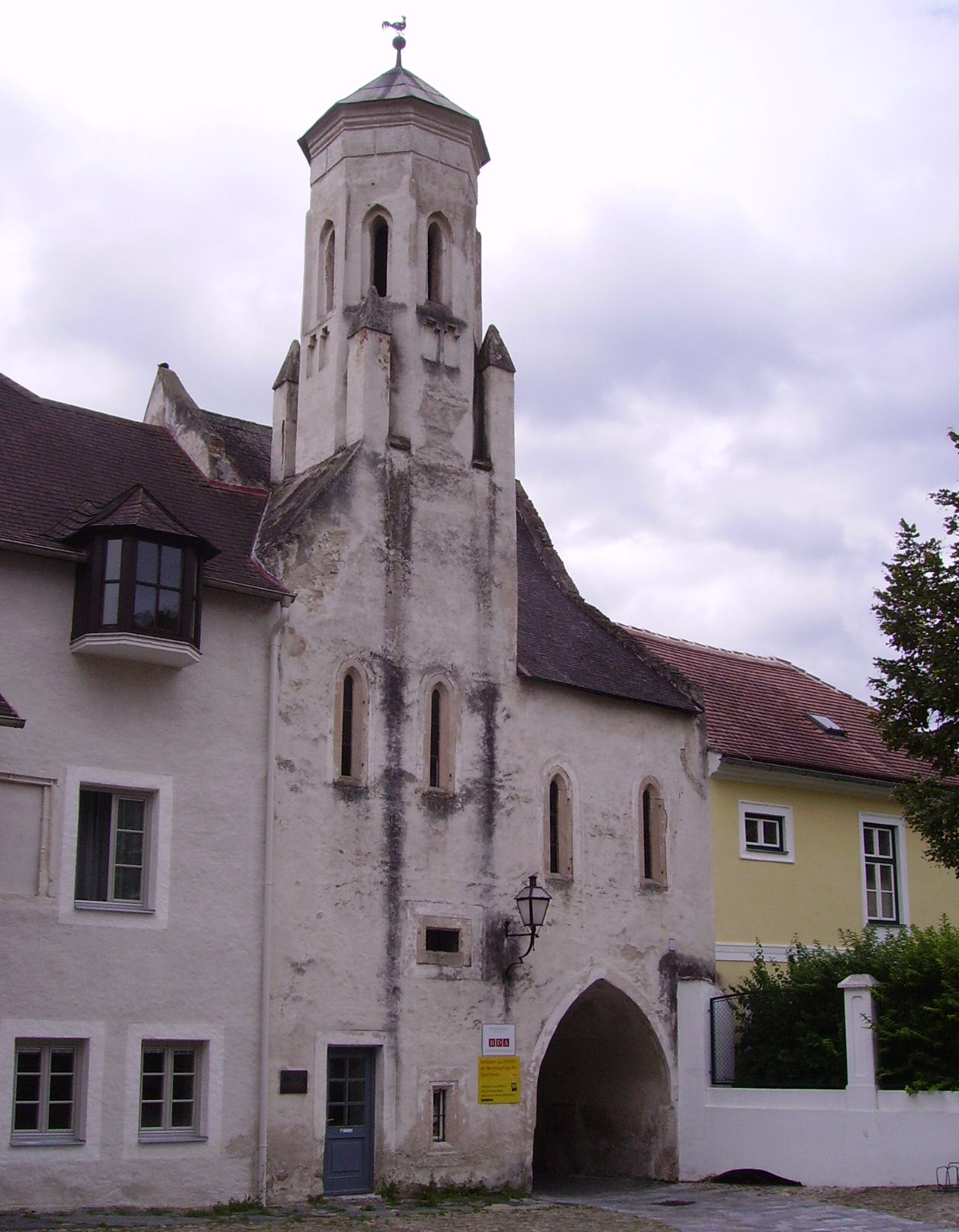
Tor in Stein (Krems)

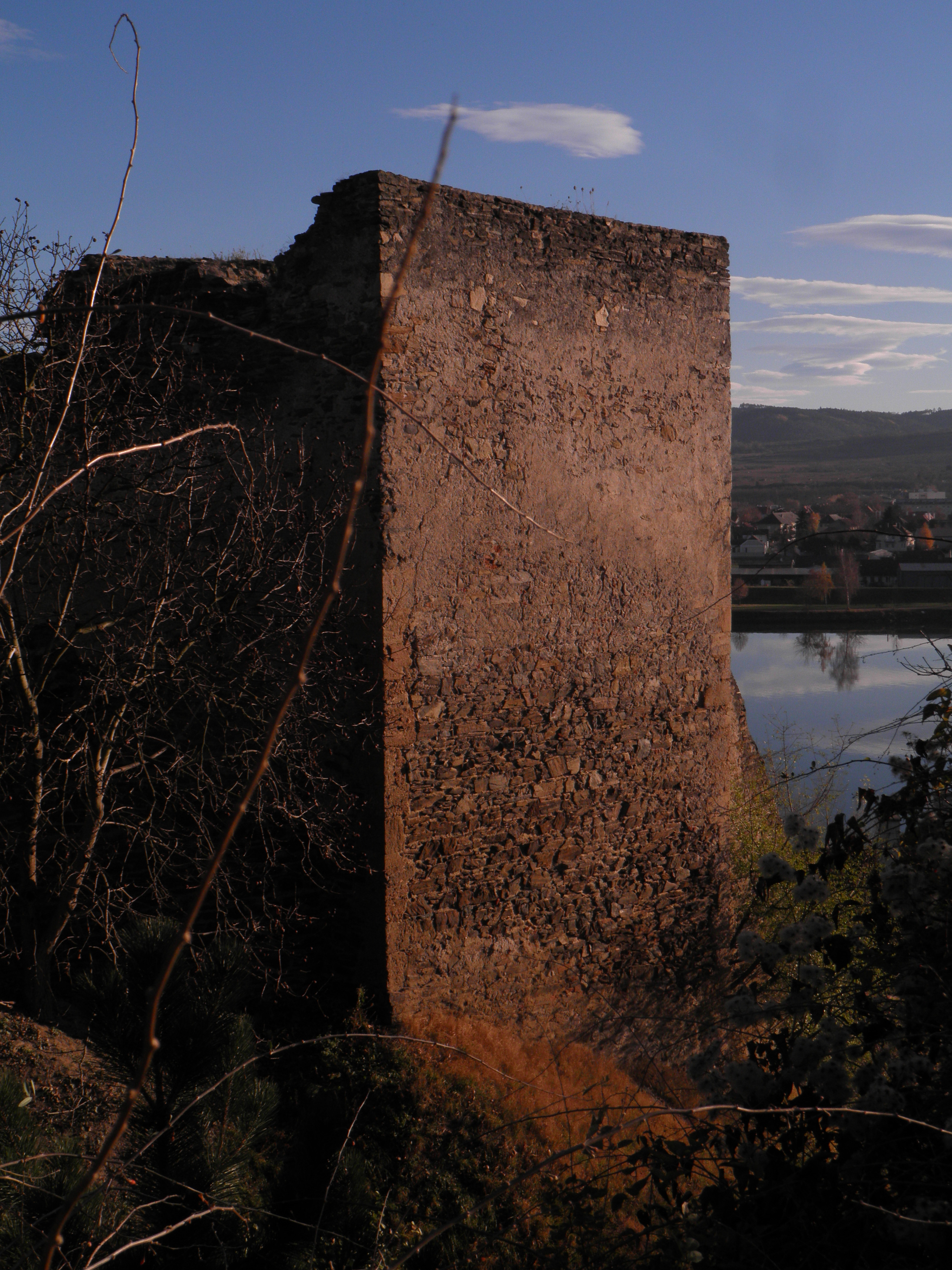
Stadtmauer Krems Stein Schlossberg Turm

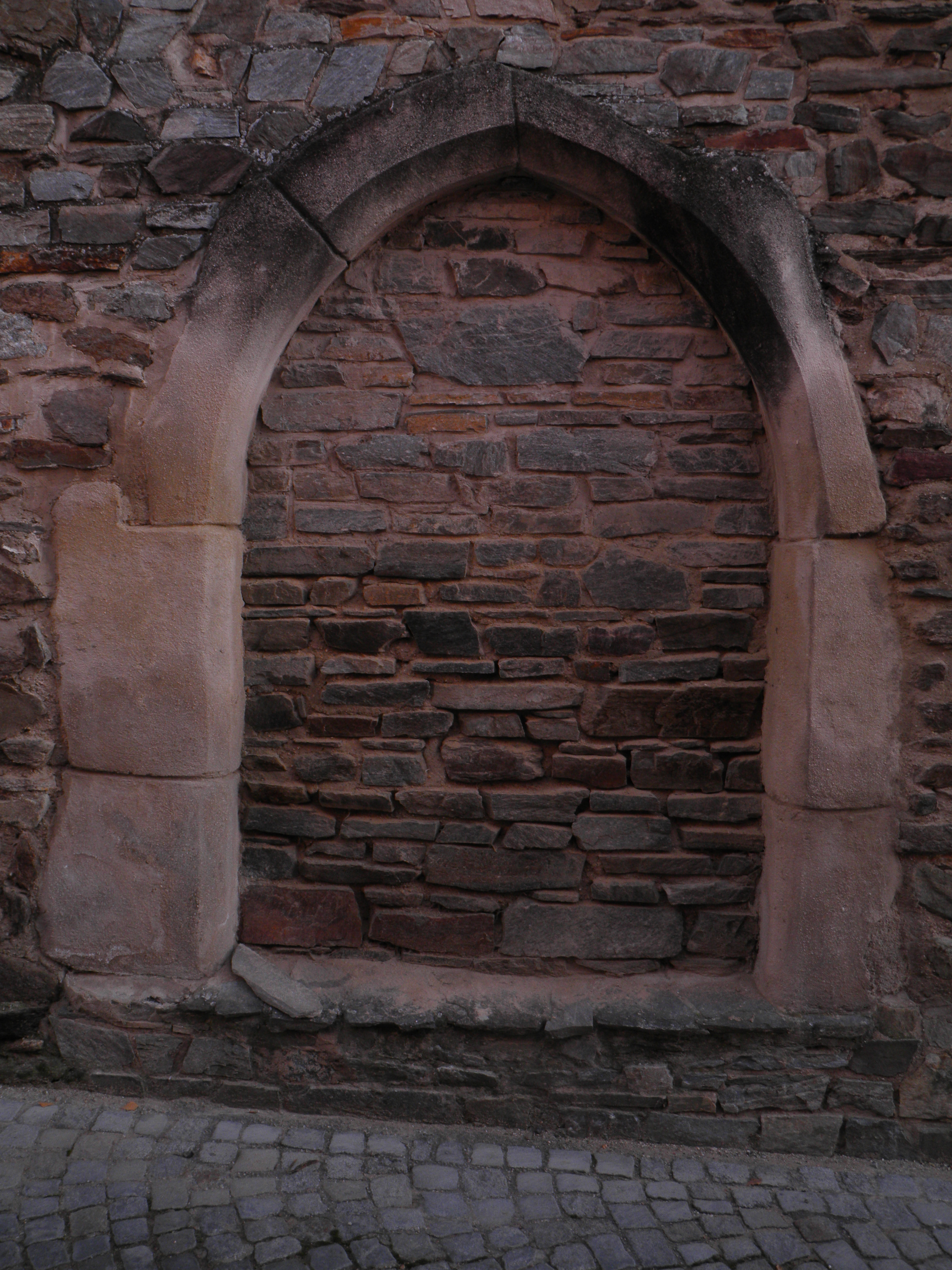
Stadtmauer Krems Stein
- Traismauer was founded as the Roman auxiliary fort of ‘Augustinianis’ and garrisoned by the Ala Thracum I from about 90 AD onwards. The defences were extensively remodelled, in approximately the same position, in the late 3rd or 4th centuries, when 'Augustinianis' was garrisoned by a cavalry unit of the 'equites Dalmartae'. The Towers of the East Gate; the Wienertor or 'Romertor'; the existing Hungerturm, and a bastion incorporated into the castle all survive from this phase. The Romans left in 488 AD and it is assumed the defences continued to be used. In the 8th century Traismuer was an important Carolingian administrative centre for the area between Enns and Vienna. A rich burial of c. 800 AD discovered in the parish church could be that of the Markgrafen Cadaloc. In 833 the Slavic Princess Privina was baptised here and Traismauer is mentioned in the Nibelungen Saga). In 860 AD, Traismauer was part of a large landholding given by King Louis the German to the Archdiocese of Salzburg. The medieval castle was set into the northwest corner of the fortified area. In the medieval period the town lost some of its importance and it was not until 1458 that it was granted market rights. Around 1500, Archbishop Leonhard of Salzburg re-fortified the town with brick walls, and enclosed it with a water-filled moat. The south and east walls were positioned about 5 metres outside the Roman defences. The Weiner Tor was rebuilt with a draw-bridge and there were two further gates the ‘St.Poeltner Tor’ – demolished 1861 – and the ‘Fleischturm’ – demolished 1877. The moat had been filled in 1772. The Vischer print of 1672 of Traismauer, shows the walls with inset circular towers and a rectangular gate-tower.
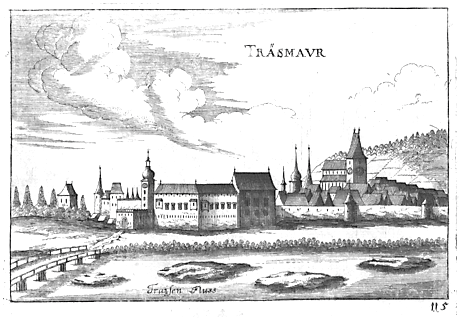
Traismauer, Lower Austria by Georg Mätthaus Vischer in 1672

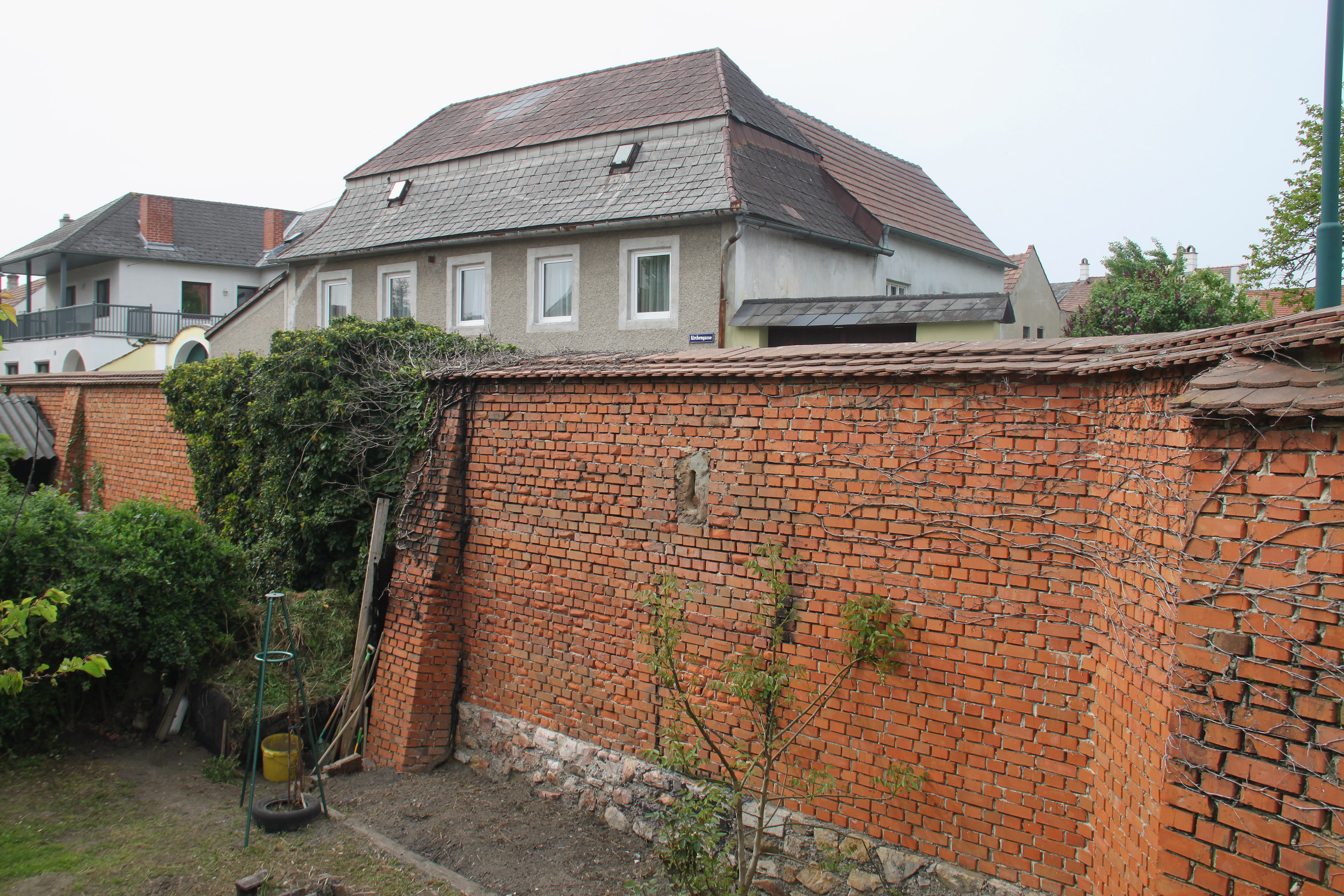
Traismauer-Befestigungsanlage

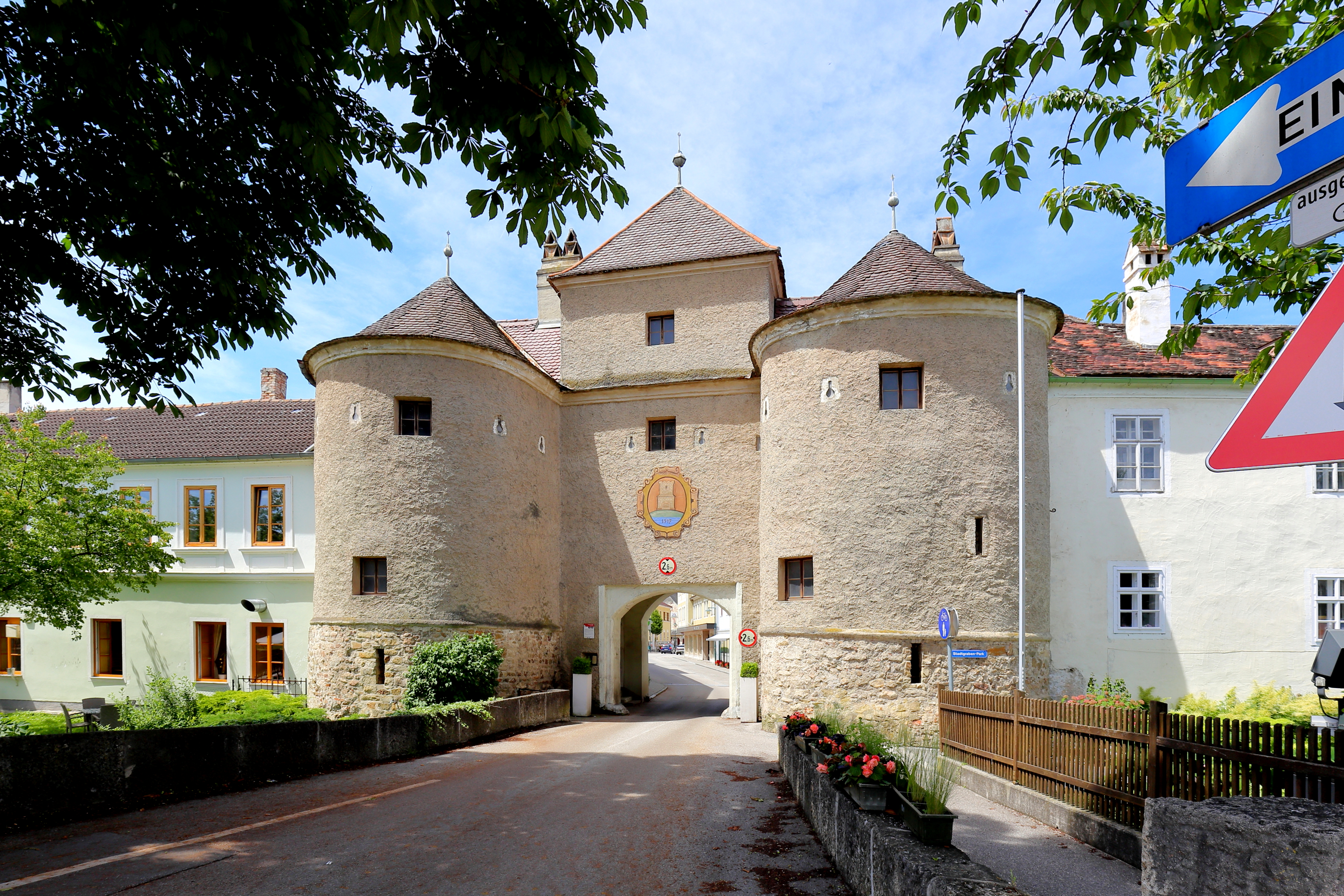
Römertor, Traismauer

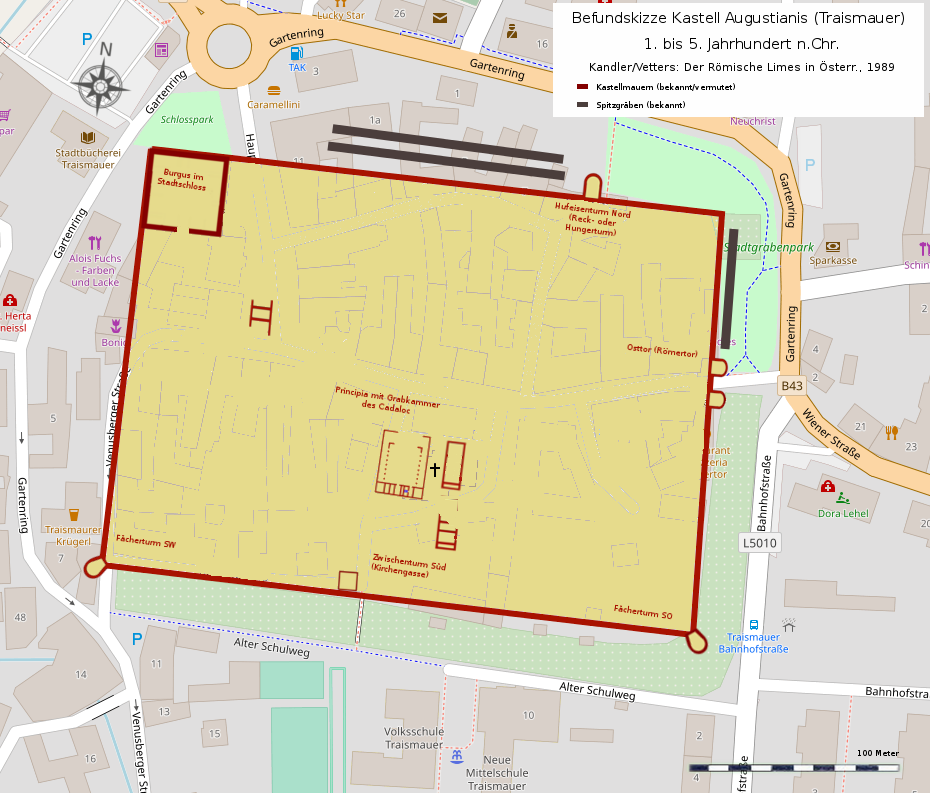
Plan showing the Roman defences Kastell Augustianis
- Tulln an der Donau was originally the Roman limes fort of ‘Comagenis’, which occupied the northeast part of the medieval town. The large Roman tower ‘Salzerturm’ at the northwest of the Roman enclosure, fronting the Danube and dating from about 300 AD, still stands. The Roman fort extended as far south as the Wienergasse. Tulln was a stopping place for Charlemagne in his campaign against the Avars in 791, and had been resettled by 985. It was an important administrative centre of the Babenbergs and was granted a charter in 1158. At about this time the town would appear to have been extended westwards and a large rectangular marketplace incorporated into a grid plan. Vischer’s view of Tulln from the south in 1672 shows that the town had a secondary wall, with round towers and a moat. Part of a tower and evidence for the moat survive at the southwest corner.
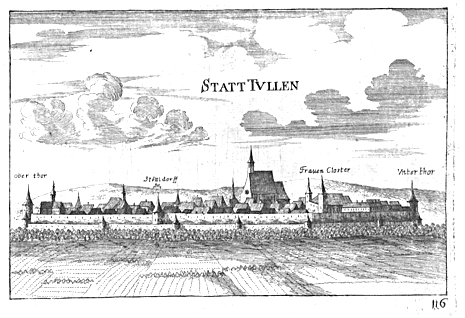
Tulln Lower Austria by Georg Mätthaus Vischer in 1672

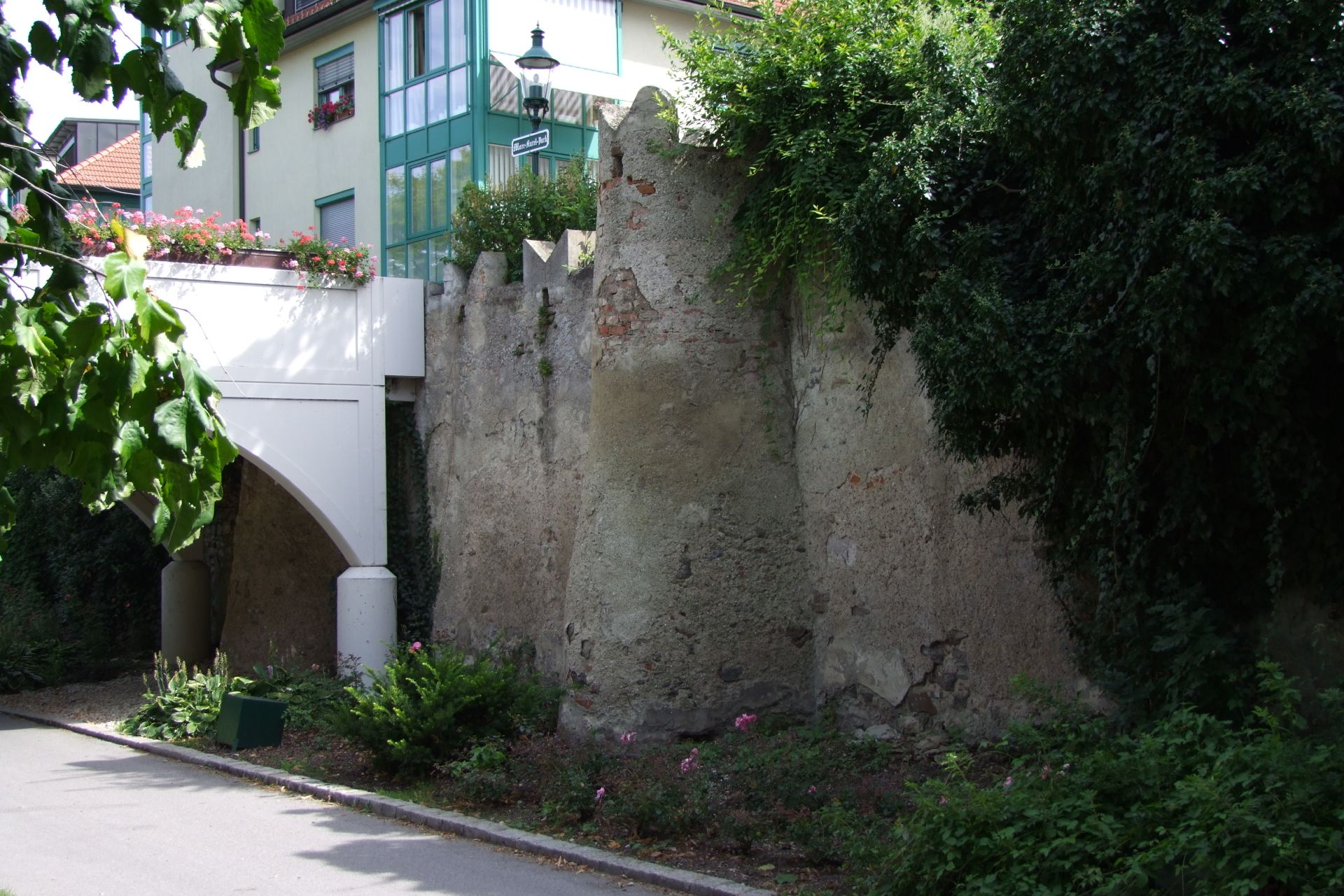
Tulln Stadtmauer

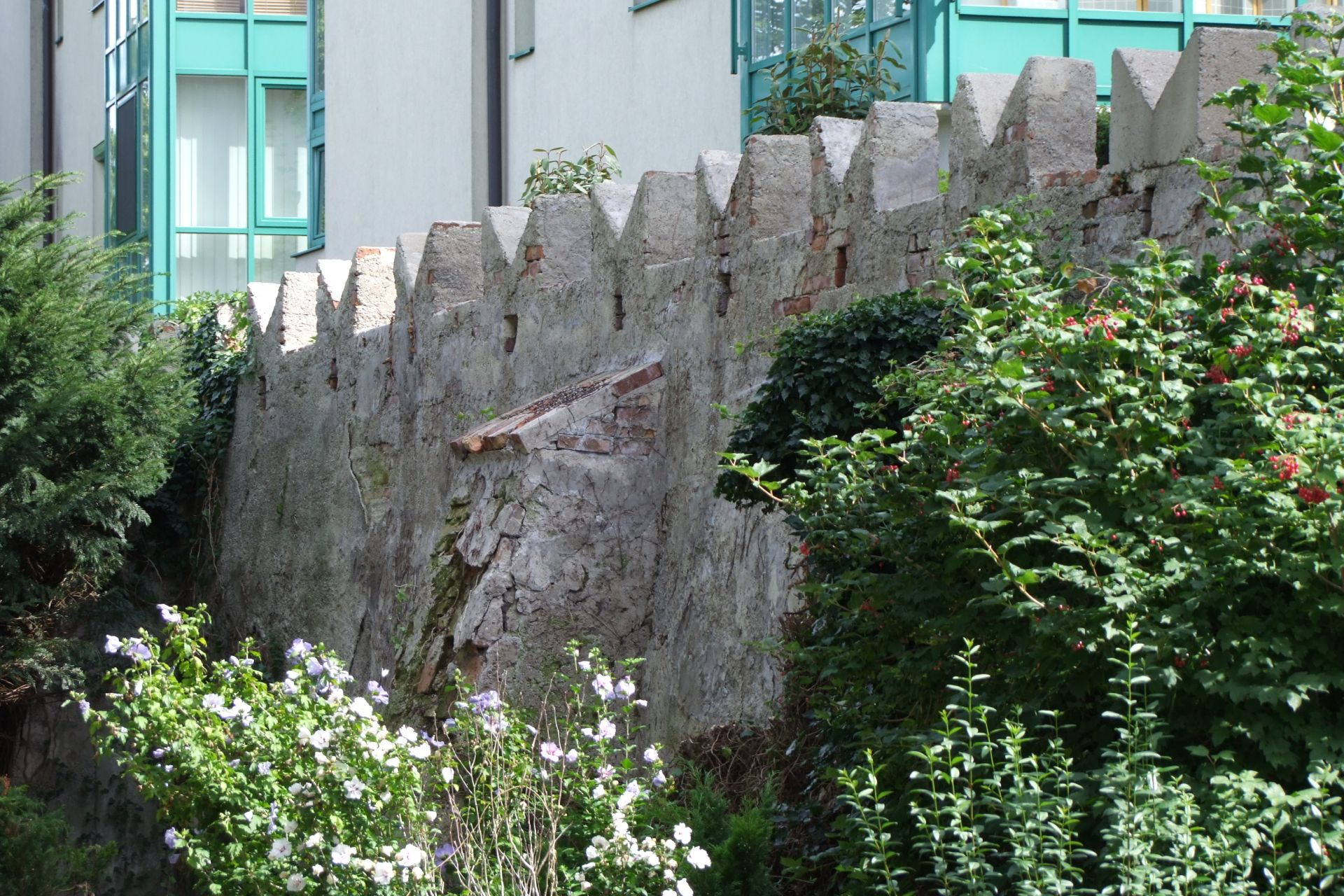
Tulln Stadtmauer

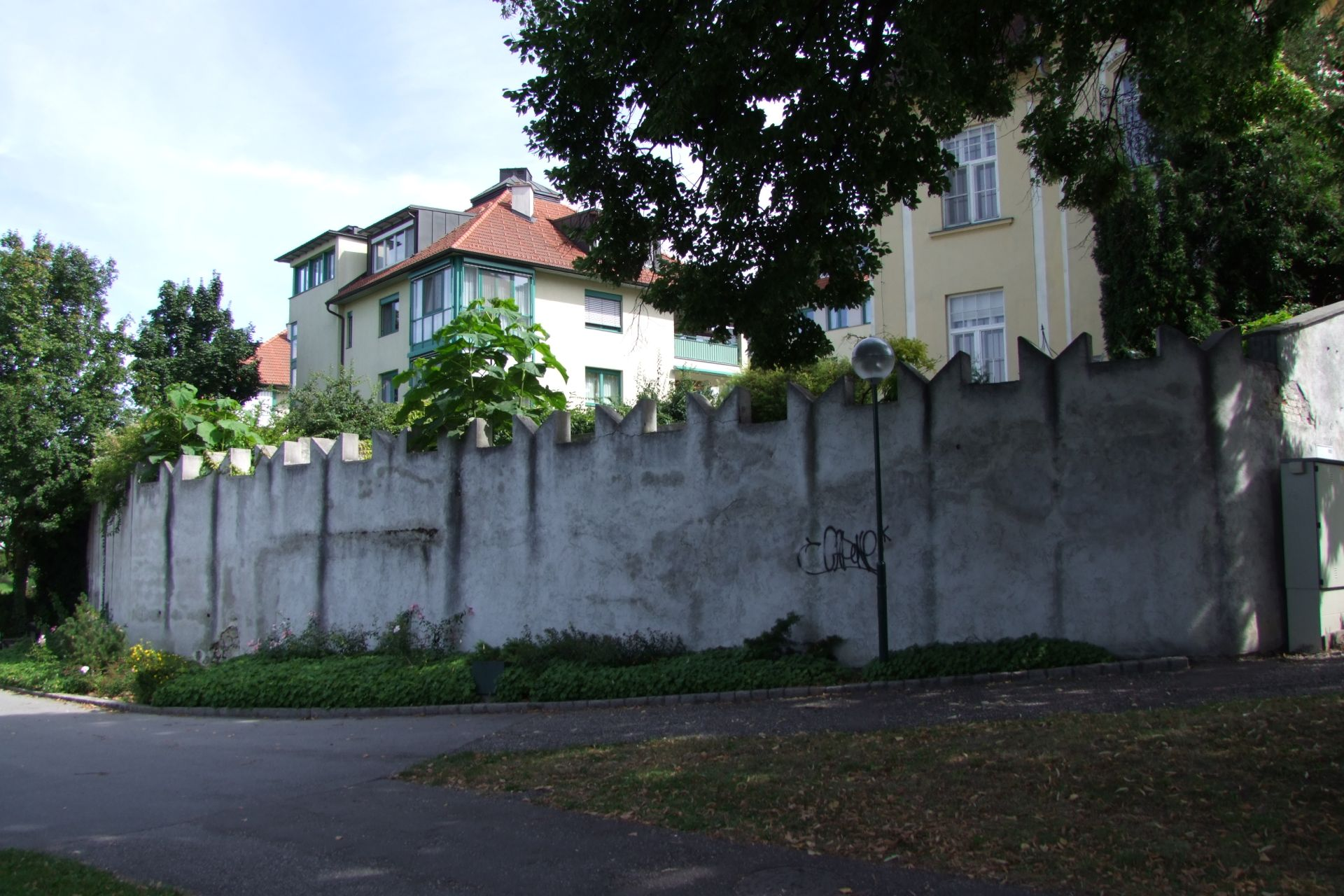
Tulln Stadtmauer
- Waidhofen an der Thaya is a triangular-shaped town with a triangular marketplace and the castle at the east end of the defences. The original settlement was further to the east at Alt Waidhofen. First mentioned in 1171, and appropriated by Duke Leopold VI in 1220, with a Charter being granted in 1230. The walls largely survive but the gate-towers have disappeared. There is a large artillery bastion centrally placed on the north wall and property boundaries suggest that Waidhofen was moated on the north and west sides. The Vischer print of 1672, shows a large angular bastion at the southwest corner of the walls.
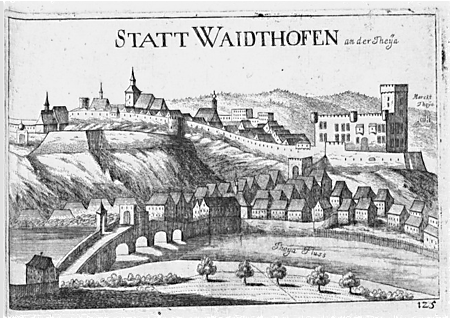
Waidhofen an der Thaya, Lower Austria by Georg Mätthaus Vischer in 1672

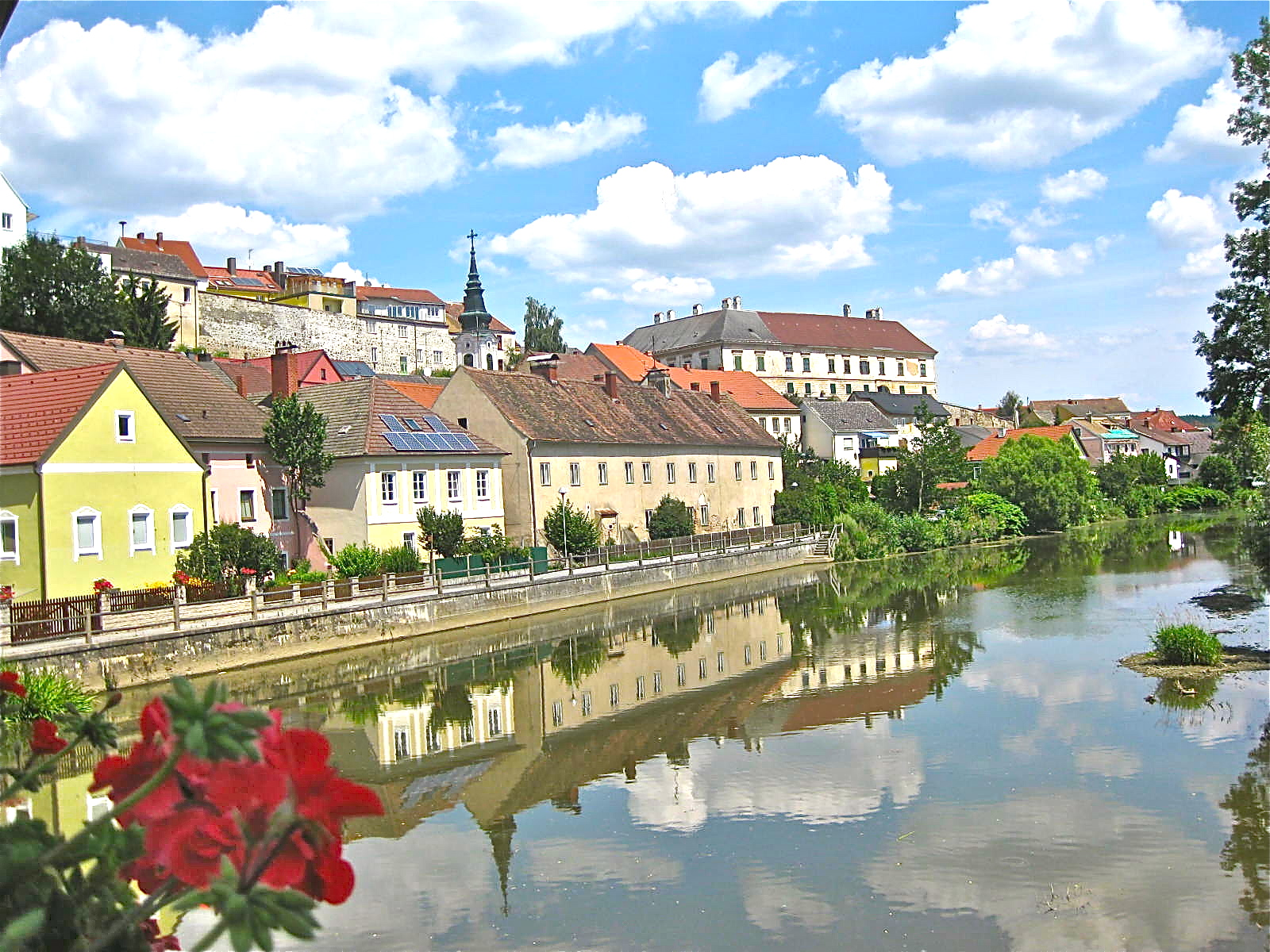
Schloss Waidhofen, Waidhofen an der Thaya

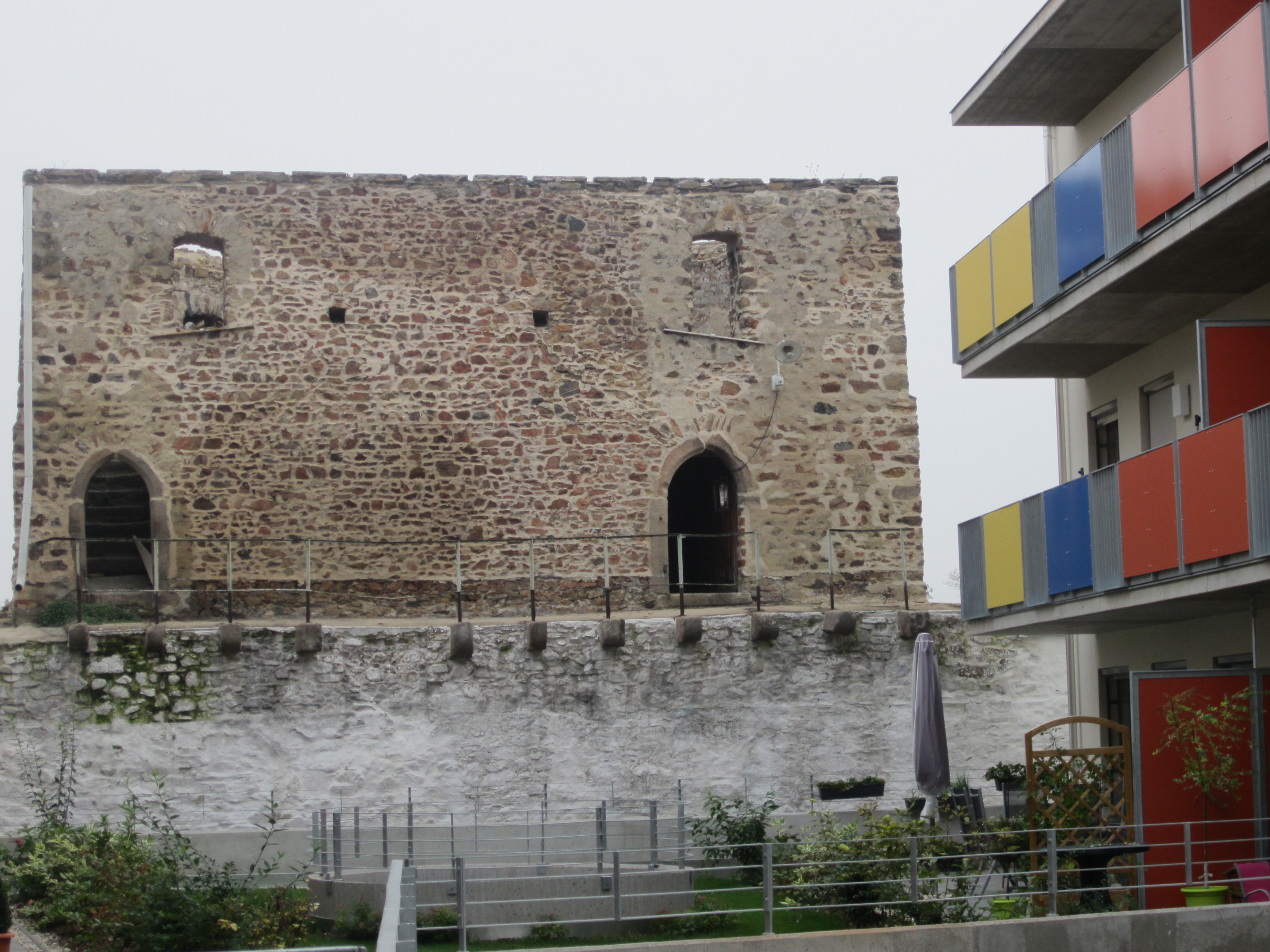
Stadtmauer GstNr. 117, Waidhofen a. d. Thaya

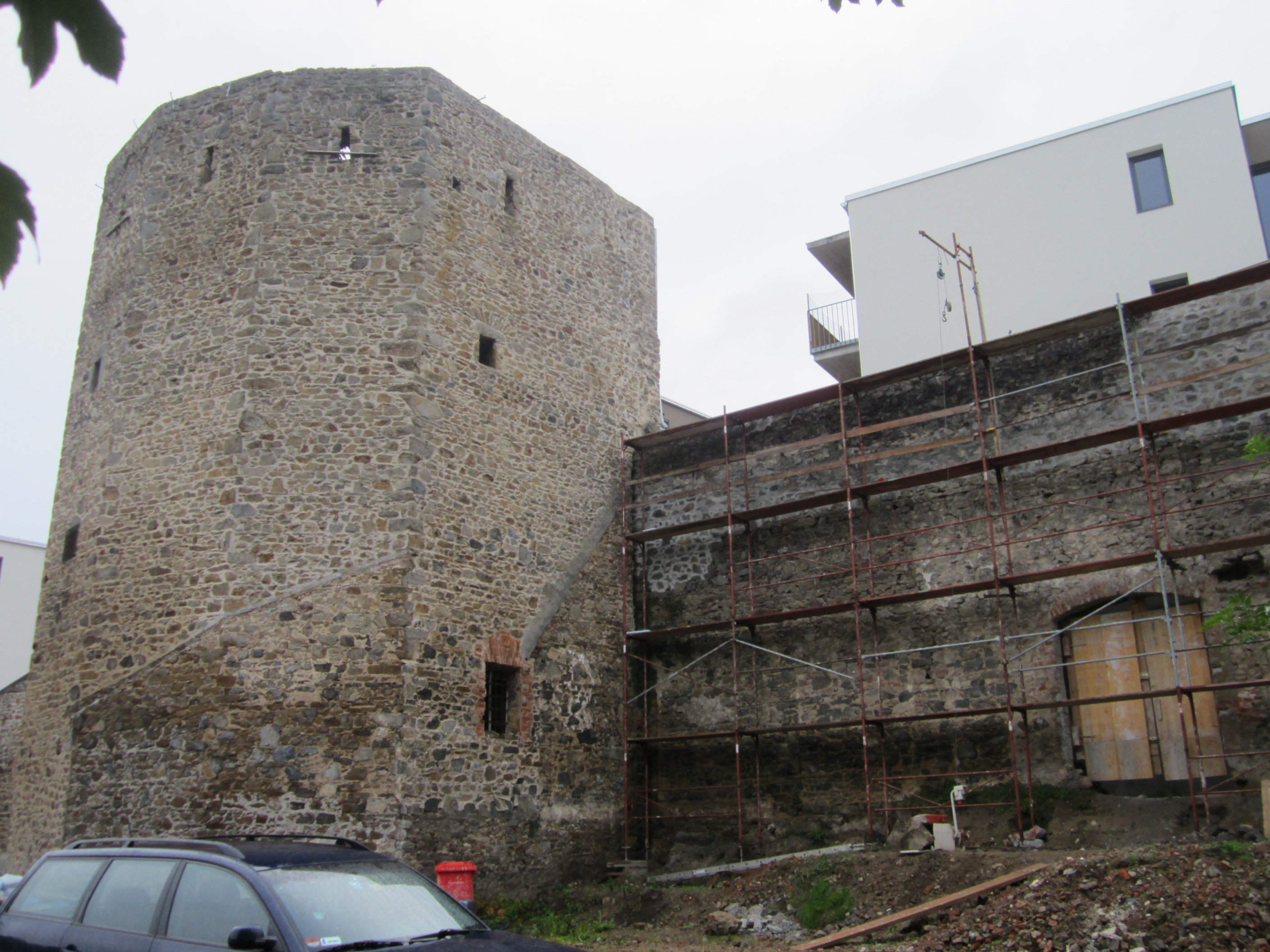
Stadtmauer GstNr. 143-1, Waidhofen a. d. Thaya-1

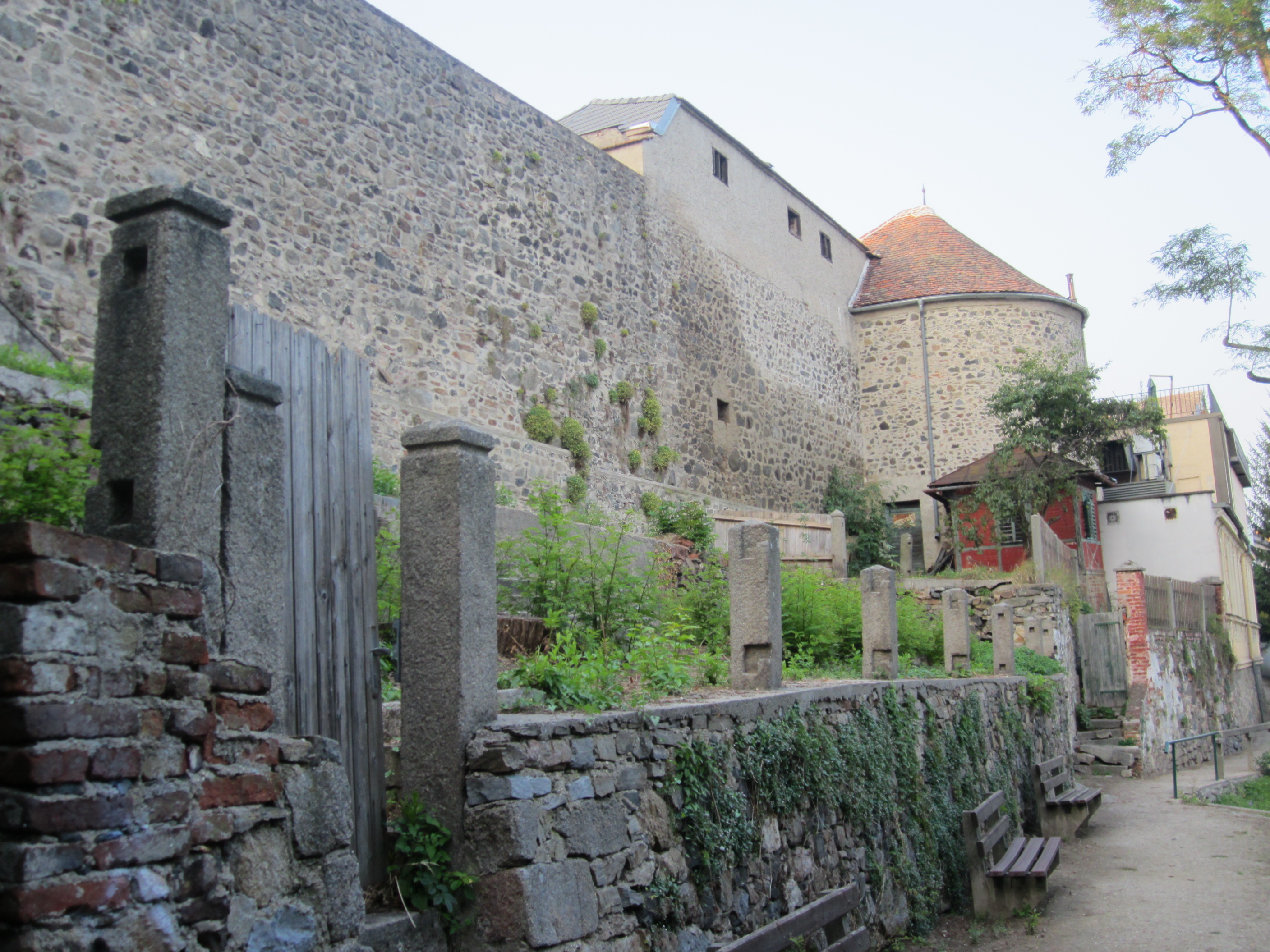
Stadtmauer GstNr. 203-1, Waidhofen a. d. Thaya-1

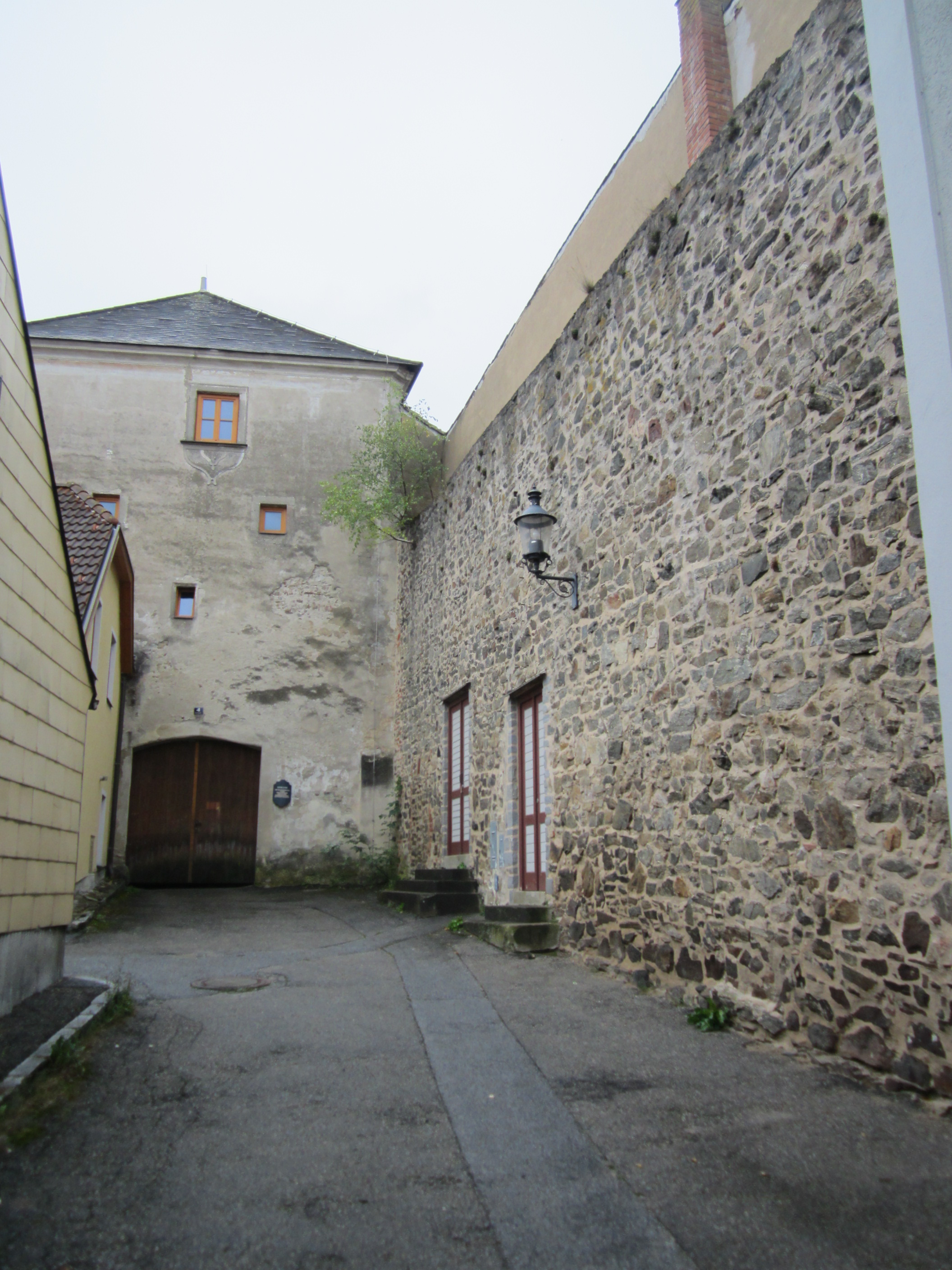
Stadtmauer GstNr. 244, Waidhofen a. d. Thaya

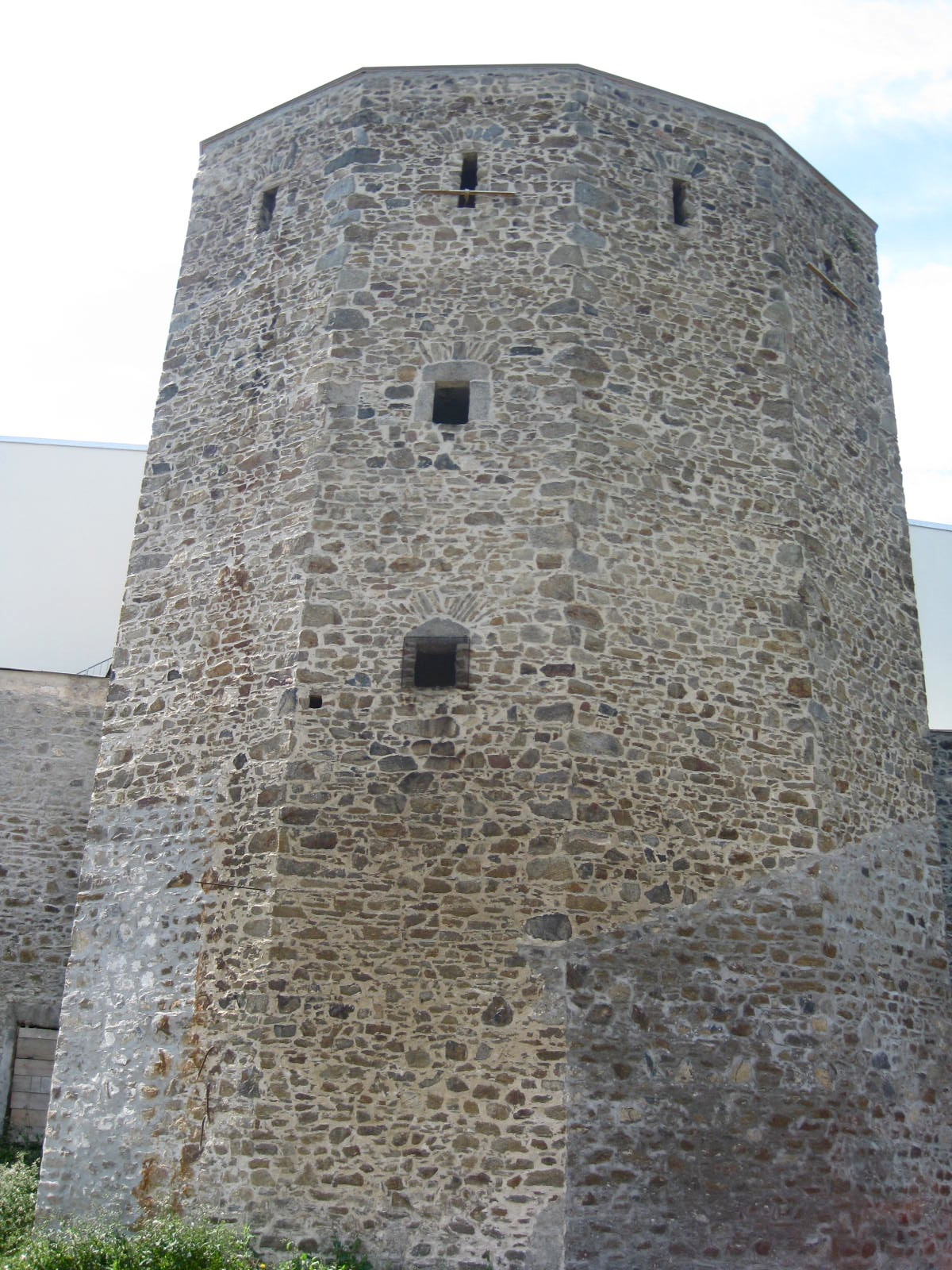
Stadtmauer und Pulverturm

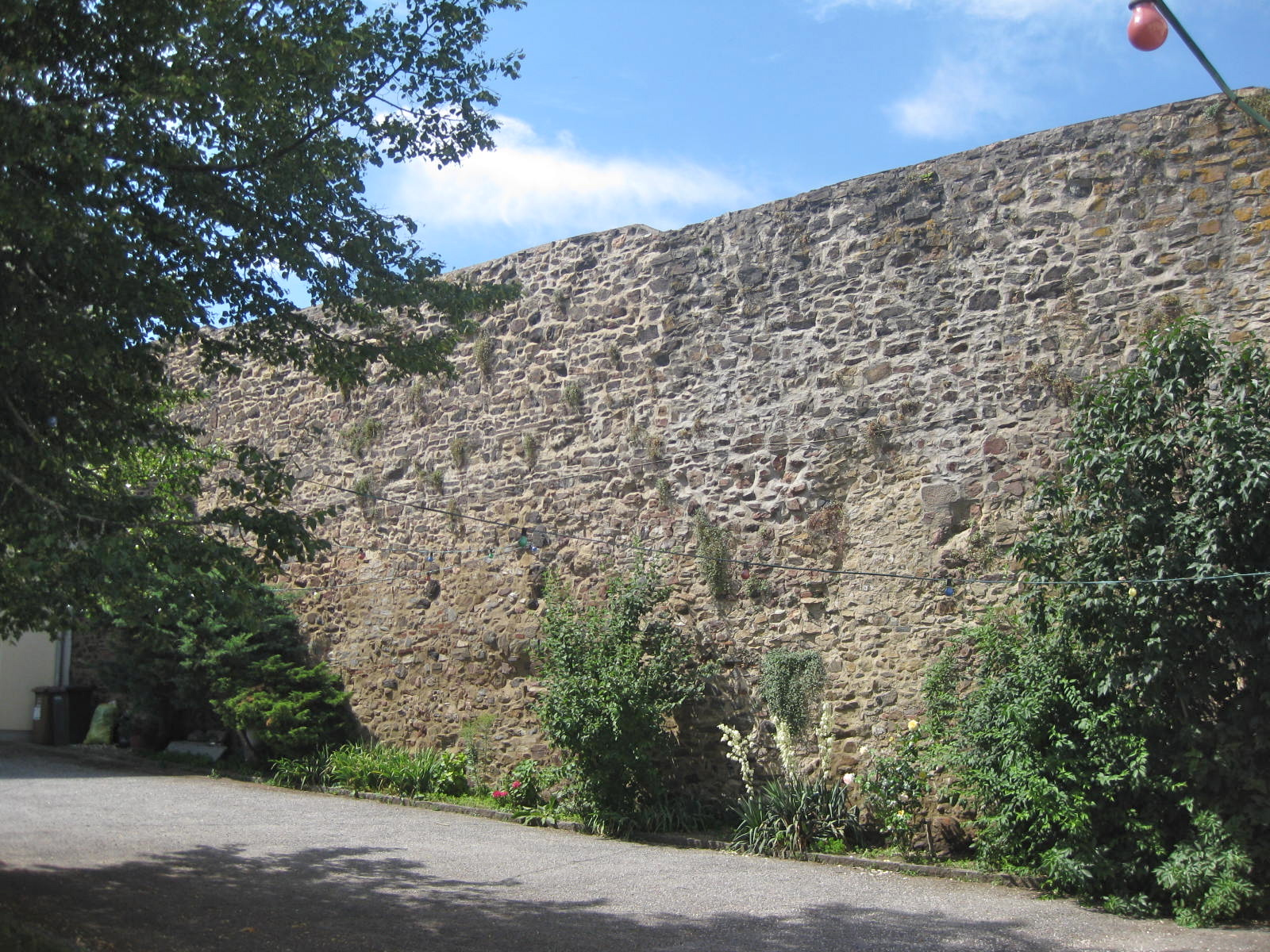
Stadtmauer Waidhofen an der Thaya
- Waidhofen an der Ybbs is sited at the juncture of the Ybbs with the Ambach Brook and has a triangular shape with the castle at the apex where the rivers join. It is first mentioned in 1171 as a possession of the Bishops of Freising and mentioned as a ‘civitas’ in 127?. The building of wall started before this in 1274, and between 1390 and 1410 the walls were greatly strengthened by the Bishop of Freising, Berthold von Wehingen, who, at the time was Chancellor of Austria. Berthol is stated to have added 13 towers to the wall but Merian’s detailed depiction of 1692 only shows seven rectangular towers and four gate-towers, which include the Ybbs Tor to the south and the Spital Tor to the SW, adjacent to the Spitals Kirche which was set in its own fortified area. Merian shows the walls with no crenellation but with regularly spaced artillery loopholes. There was a water filled moat on the S, parallel with the Ambach brook. Merian also shows that a rectangular grid of suburbs to the S. Waidhofen has two marketplaces the ‘Ober Markplatz’ leading from the castle to the Ybbs Tor which long and spindle-shaped, and the ‘Unter Markplatz’, which is broader, but not three-sided. The arrangement suggests that the Ober Markplatz belongs to an earlier phase.
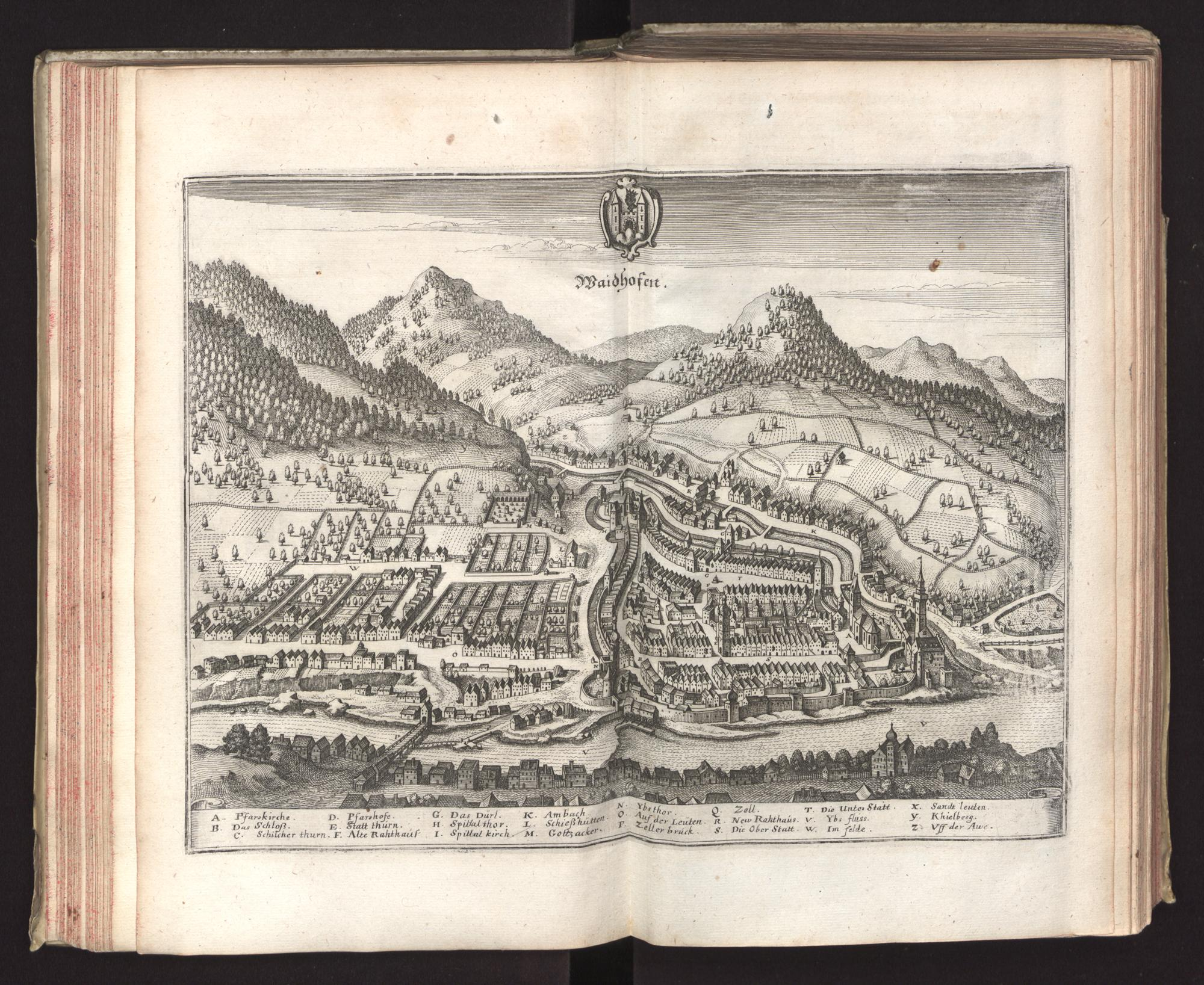
Topographia Austriacarum (Merian) 1679

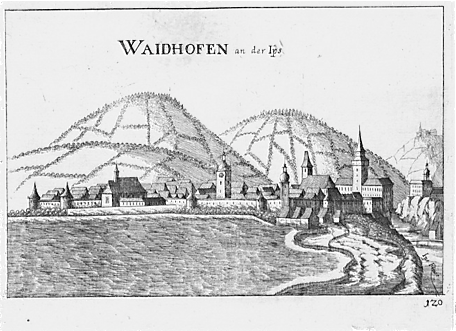
Waidhofen an der Ybbs, Lower Austria by Georg Mätthaus Vischer 1672

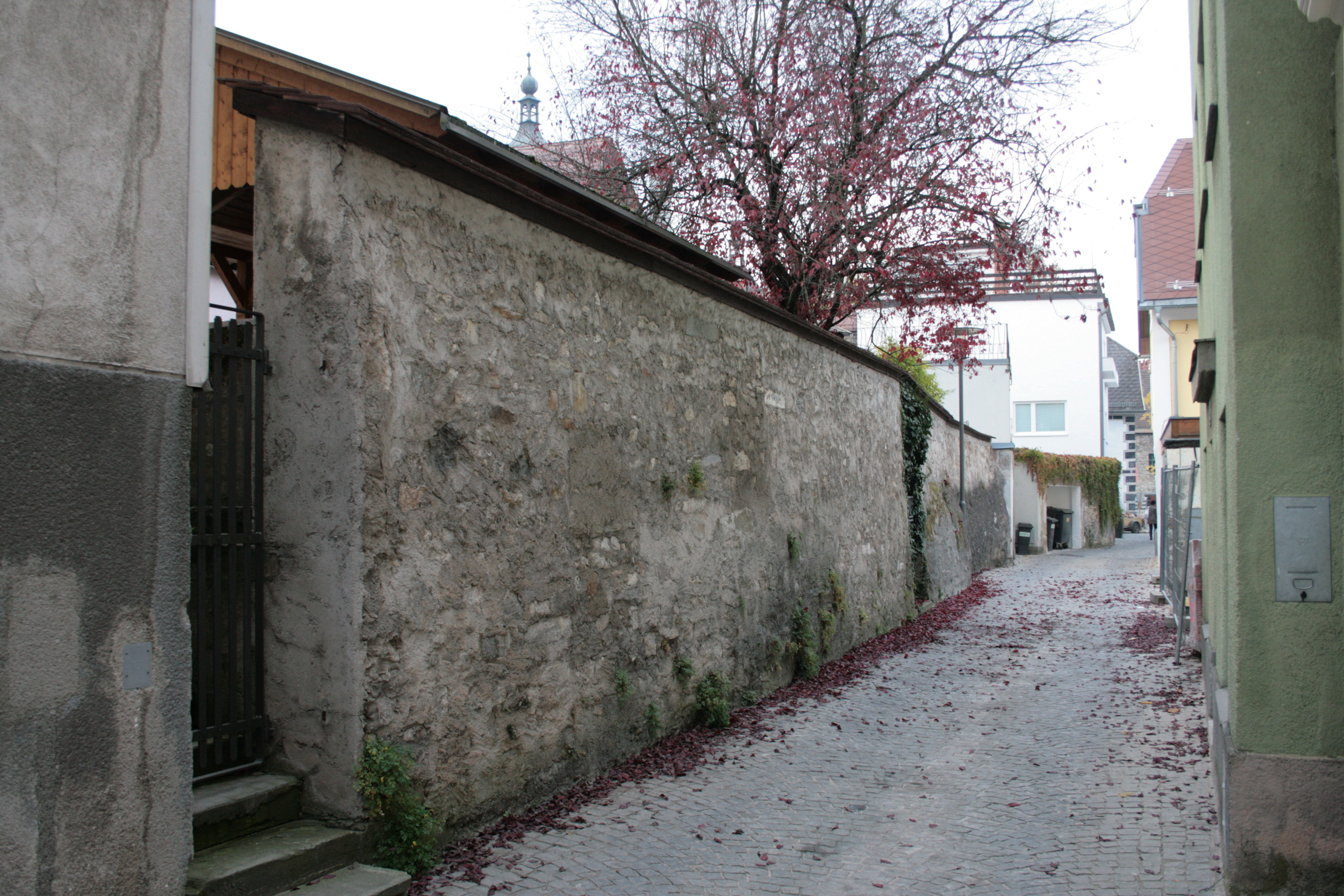
WaidhofenYbbs Hintergasse Stadtmauer

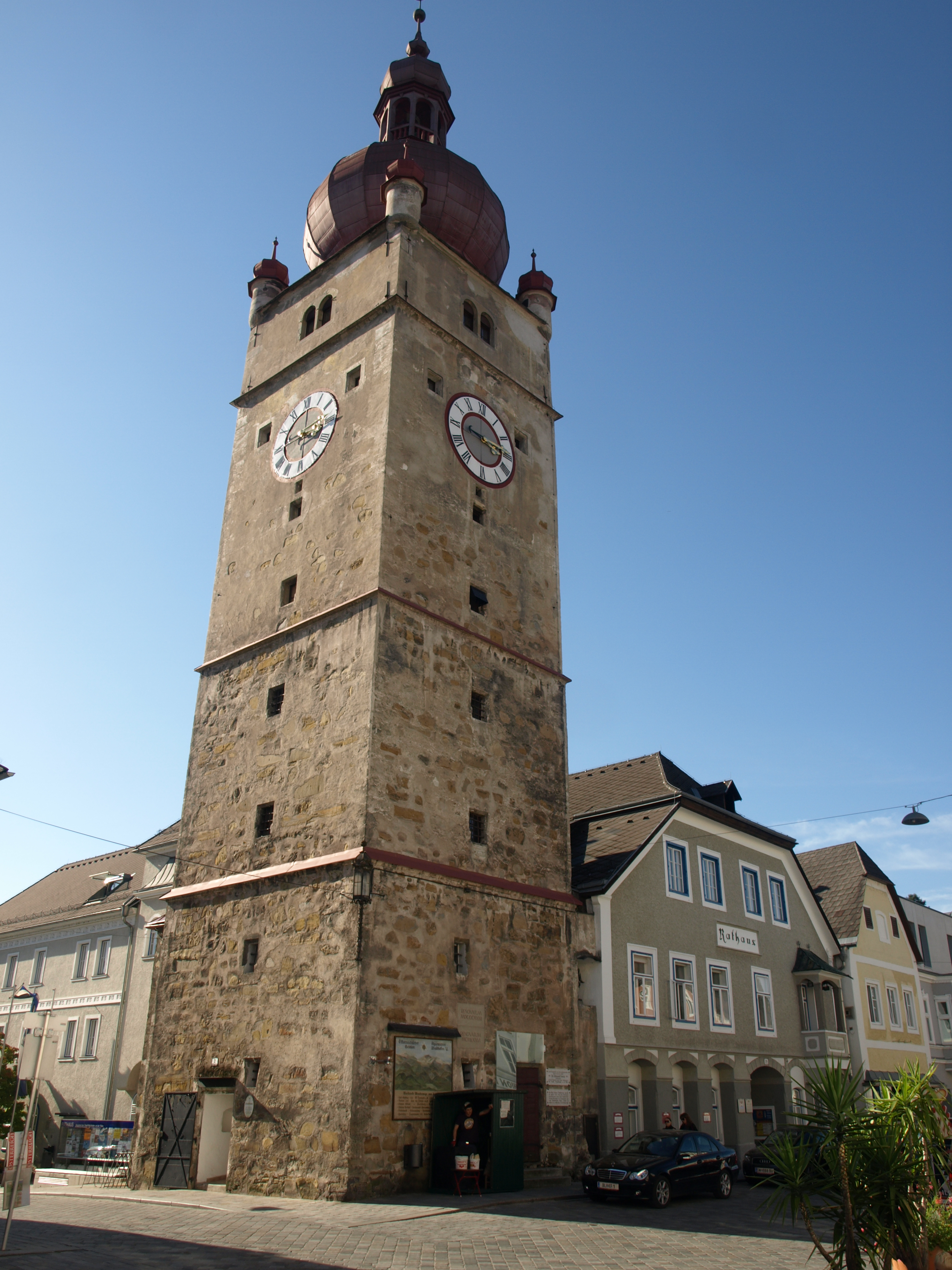
2009.10.04 - 01 - Waidhofen a.d. Ybbs

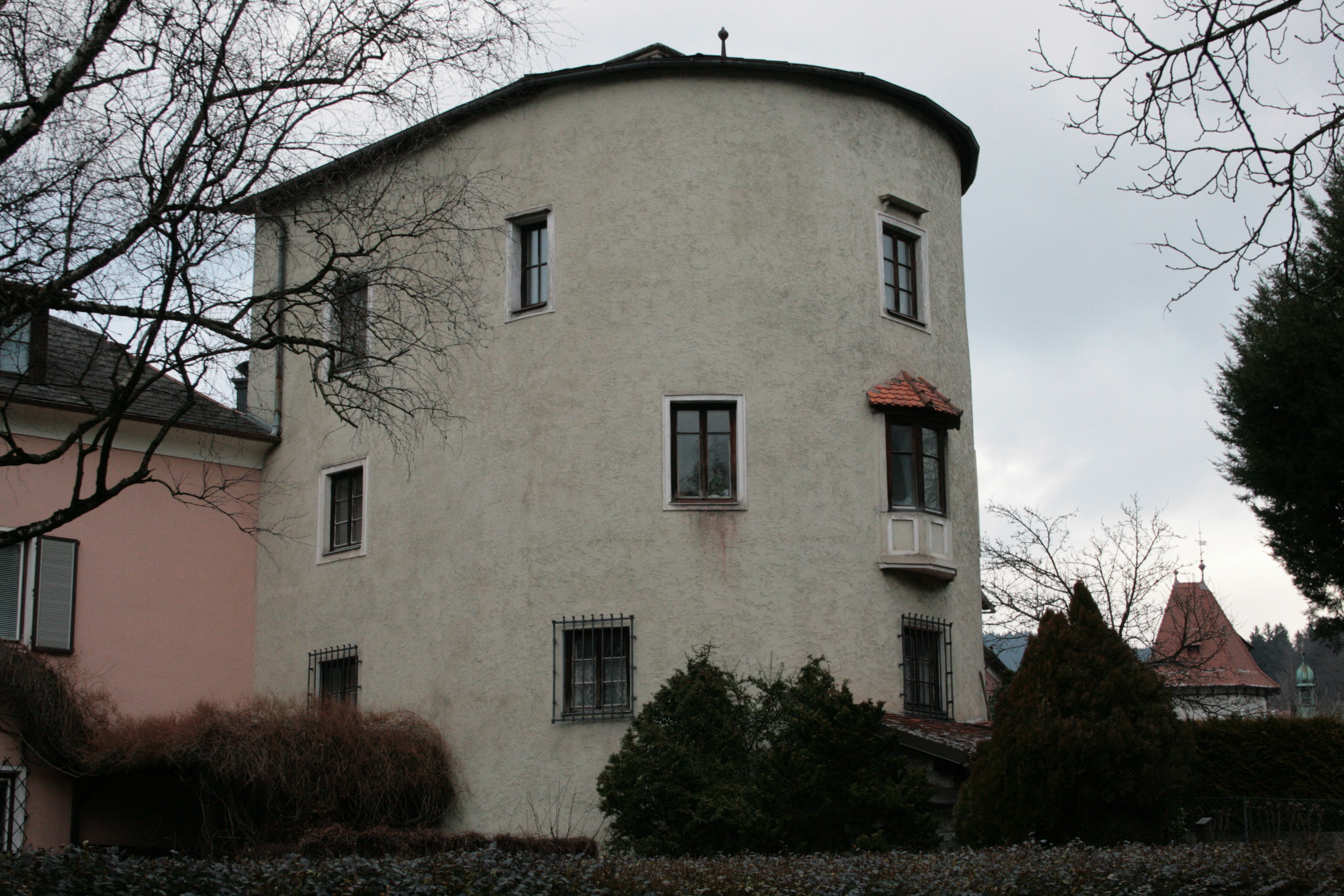
WaidhofenYbbs Graben 32 Lachentturm

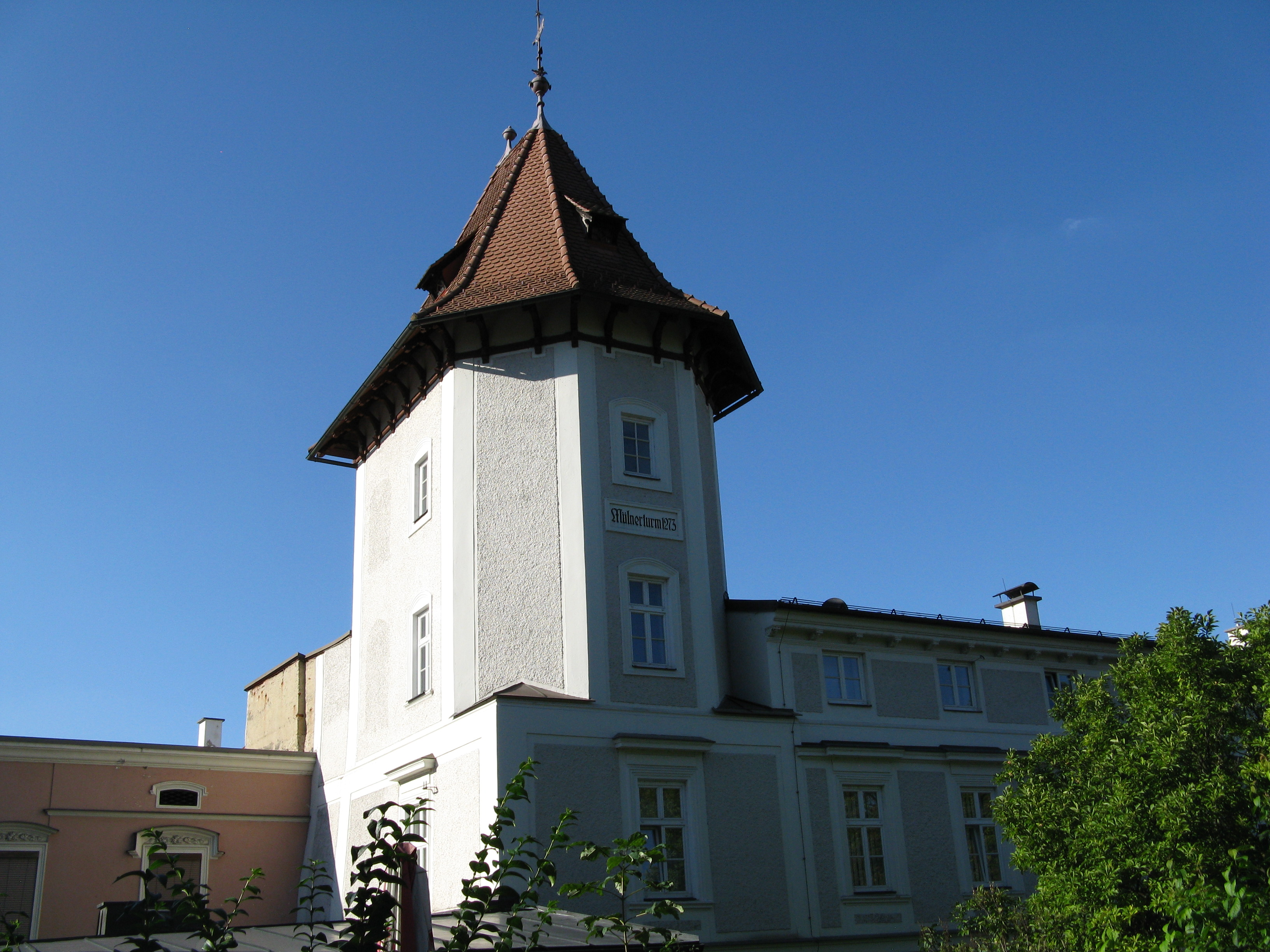
Waidhofen an der Ybbs Müllnerturm
- Wiener Neustadt was a new town laid out around 1192 by the Babenberg Duke Leopold V of Austria, following his acquisition of the Duchy of Styria, using silver (120,000 marks) from the ransom of Richard the Lionhart to pay for the walls. The defences are almost rectangular measuring 600 by 680 metres. The town was granted a charter in 1210. The town is on the historic boundary between the Duchy of Styria and Hungary. The castle - southeast corner - was the residence of Emperor Friedrich III and the birthplace of Emperor Maximilian I. Merian’s print of 1679 shows large low circular bastions at the corners of the town, but these would have been replaced by that time with pointed bastions in the Italian style. The walls were extensively damaged by bombing in World War II. While the bastions no longer survive, there are lengths of crenellated wall on the northwest where the Eckturm survives, a length on the west with a tower, a restored length in the south and a further tower and length of wall on the E.
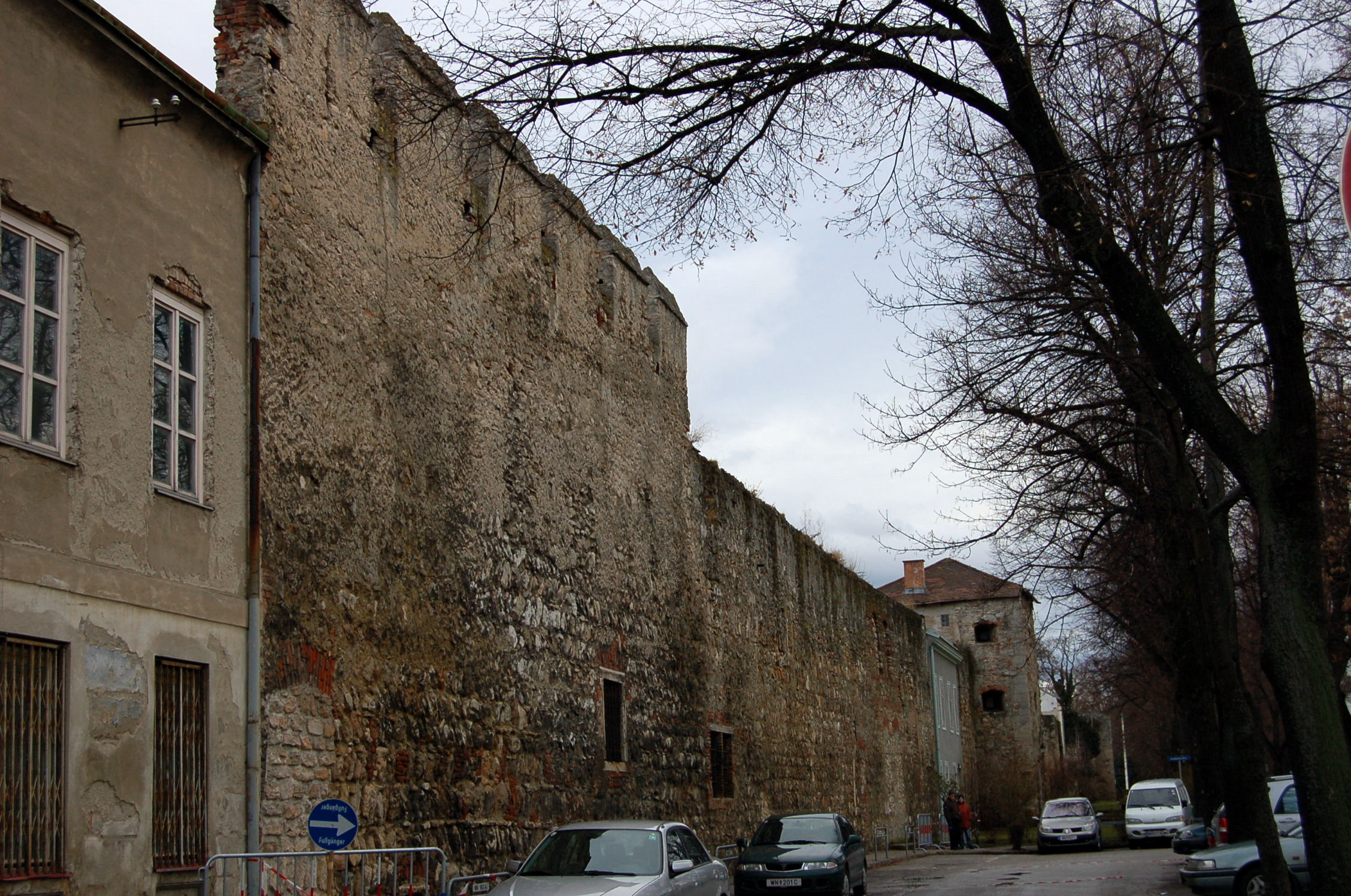
Wiener Neustadt Stadtmauer

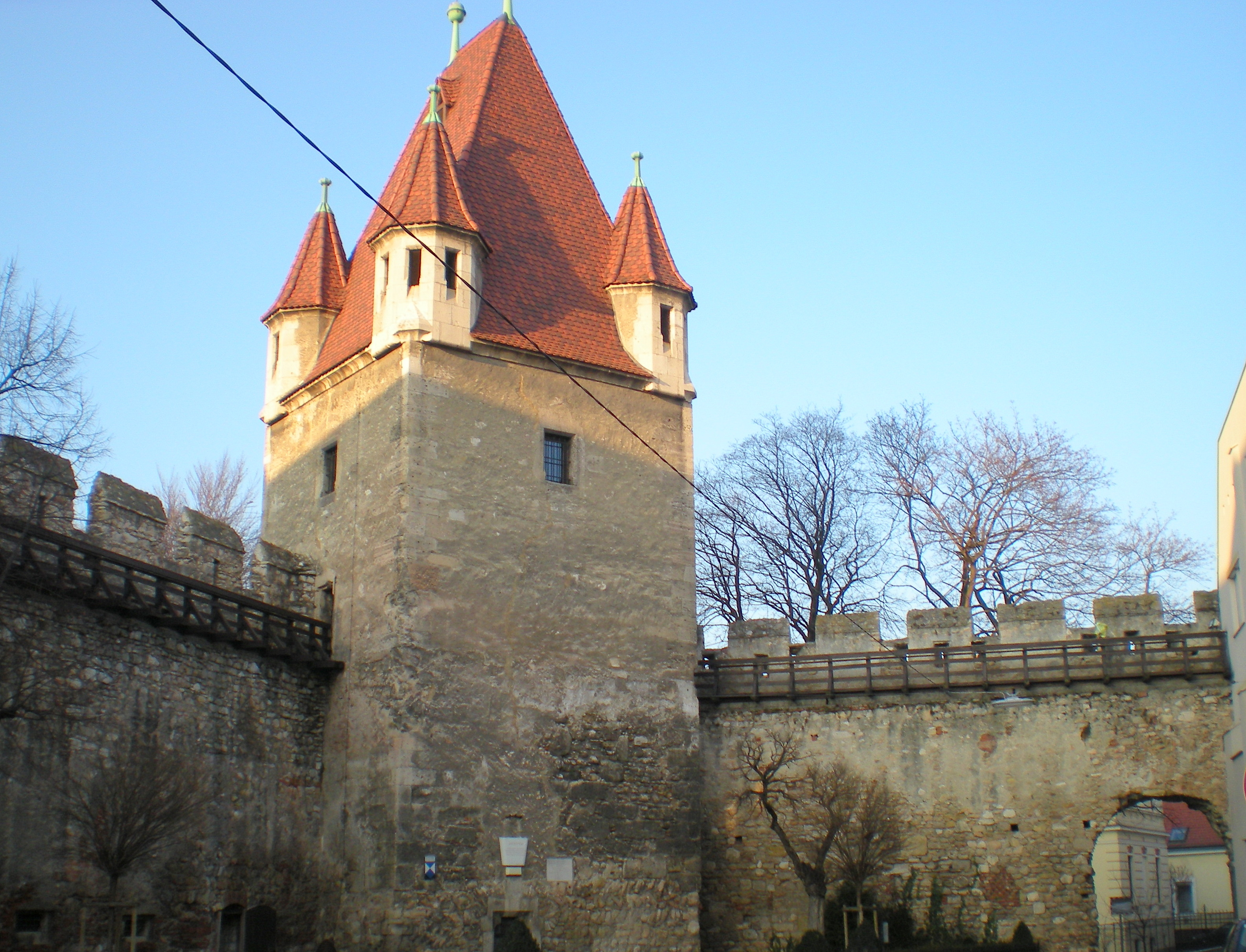
Wiener Neustadt Reckturm

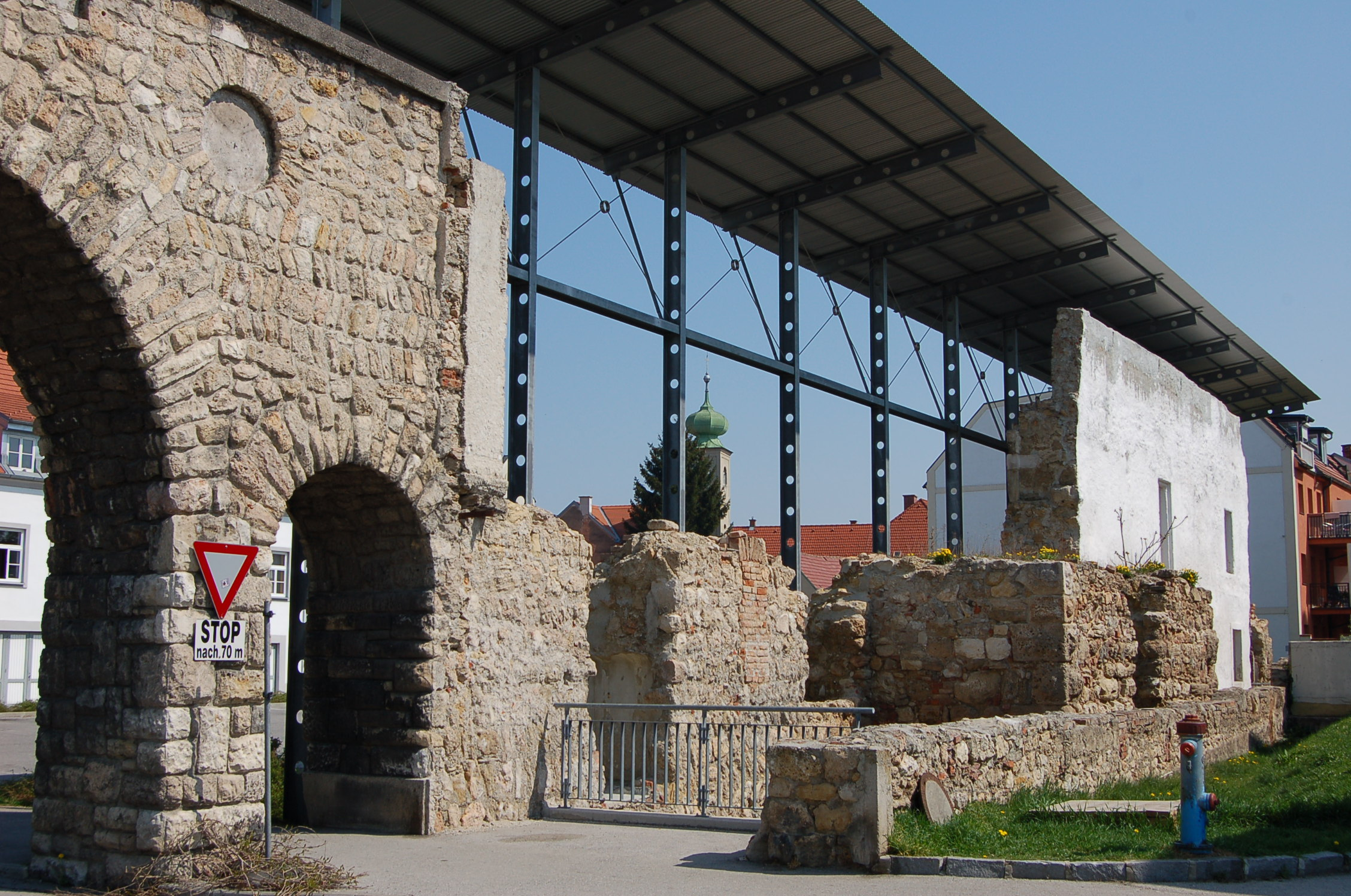
Wiener Neustadt Stadtmauer

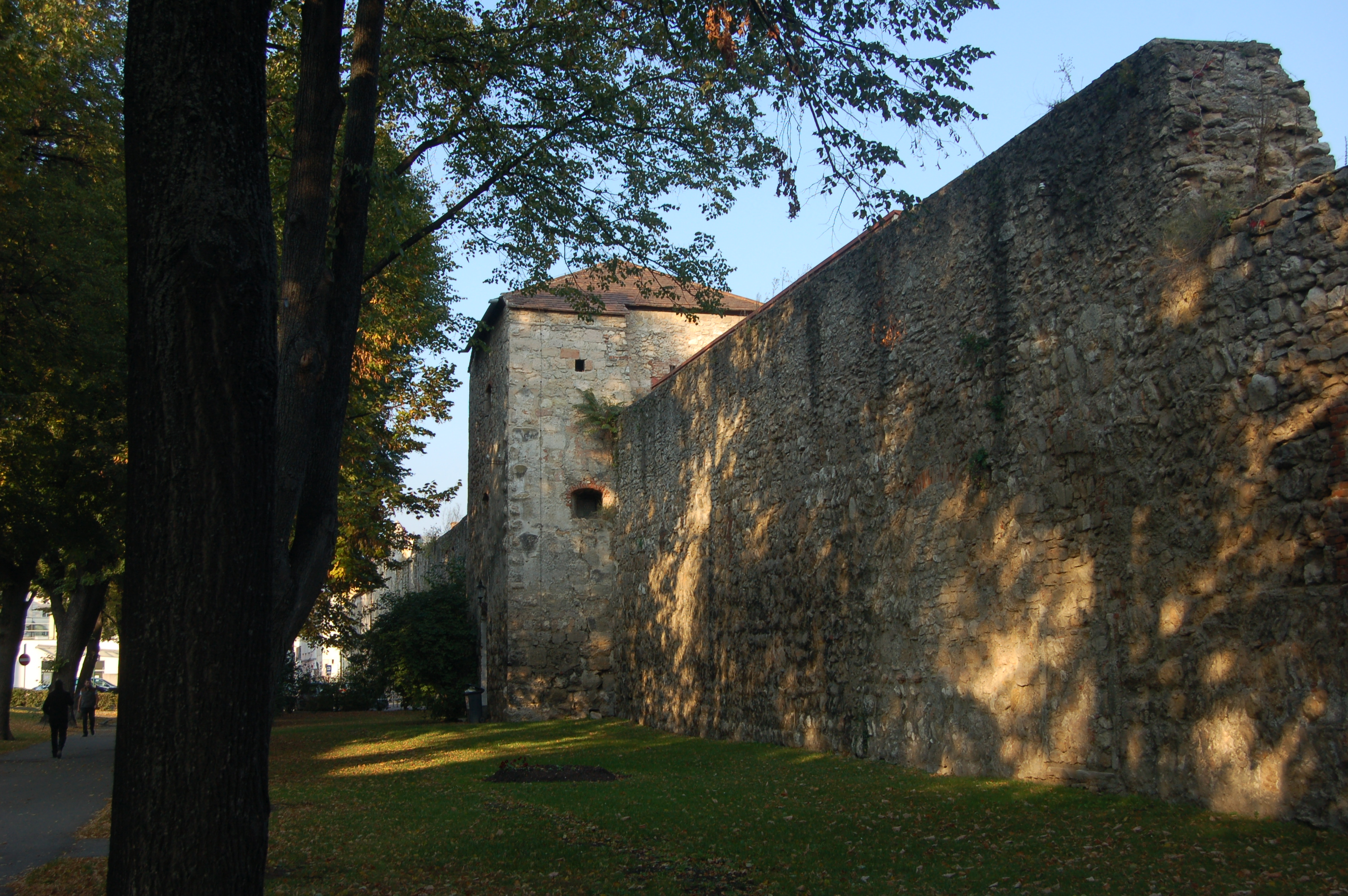
WienNeustadt Stadtmauer Rabenturm
- Weitra was laid out between 1201 and 1208 by the Kuenringer Hadmar II. Situated on a higher area of land to the east of the Lainsitz river, on the boundary between Bohemia and Austria. Granted a charter in 1321. The town wall is largely intact with the 16th century ‘Obere Tor’ gate surviving on the East. The Renaissance castle built on the southeast side of the walls may be on the site of an earlier medieval castle.
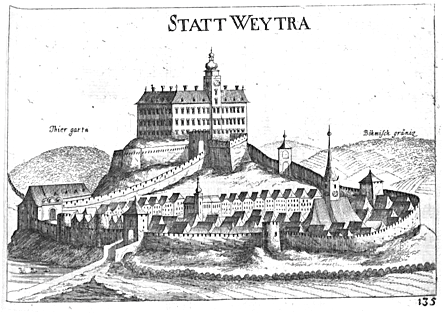
Weitra, Lower Austria by Georg Mätthaus Vischer in 1672

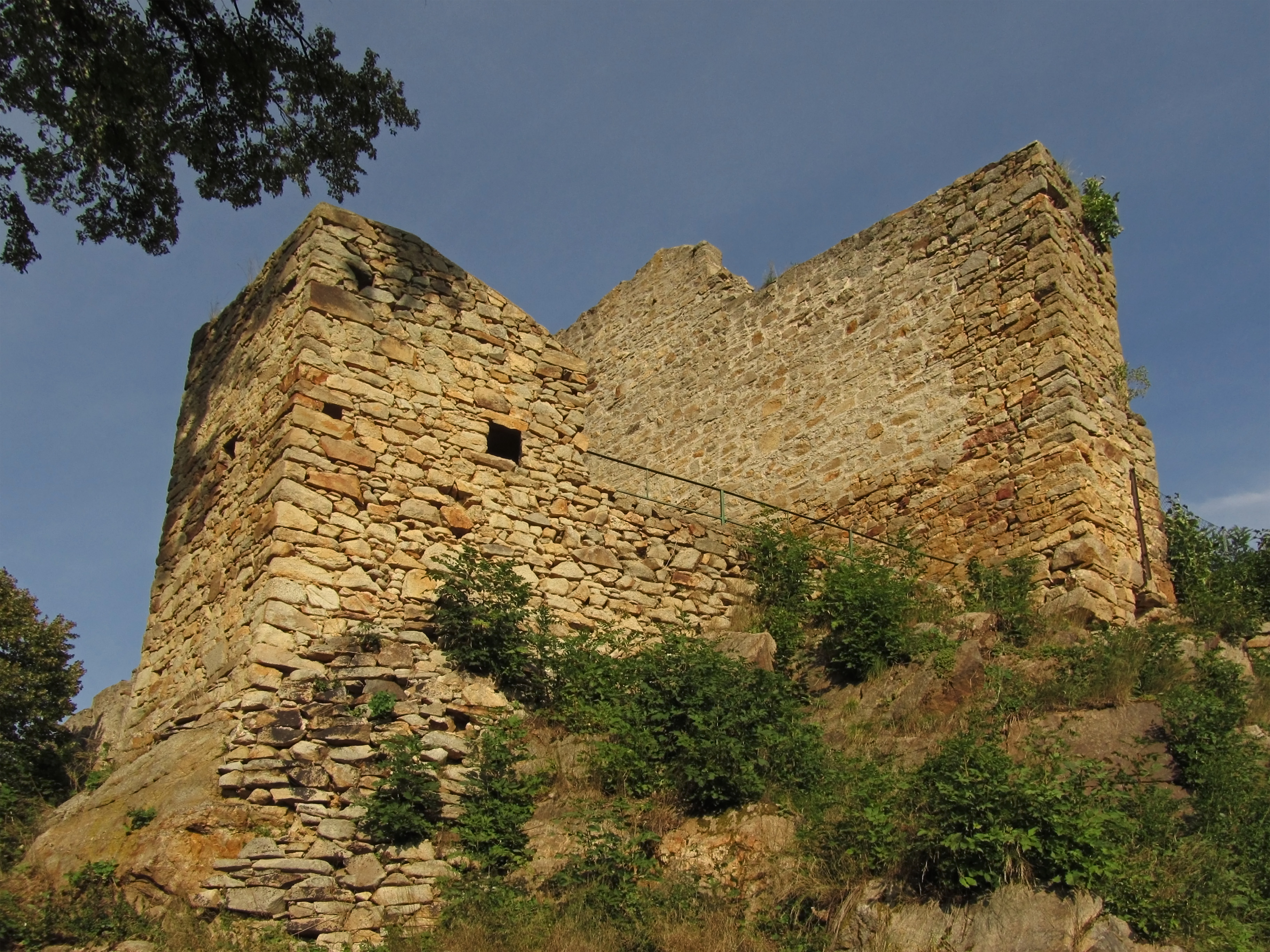
Westlicher Teil der Stadtmauer in Weitra

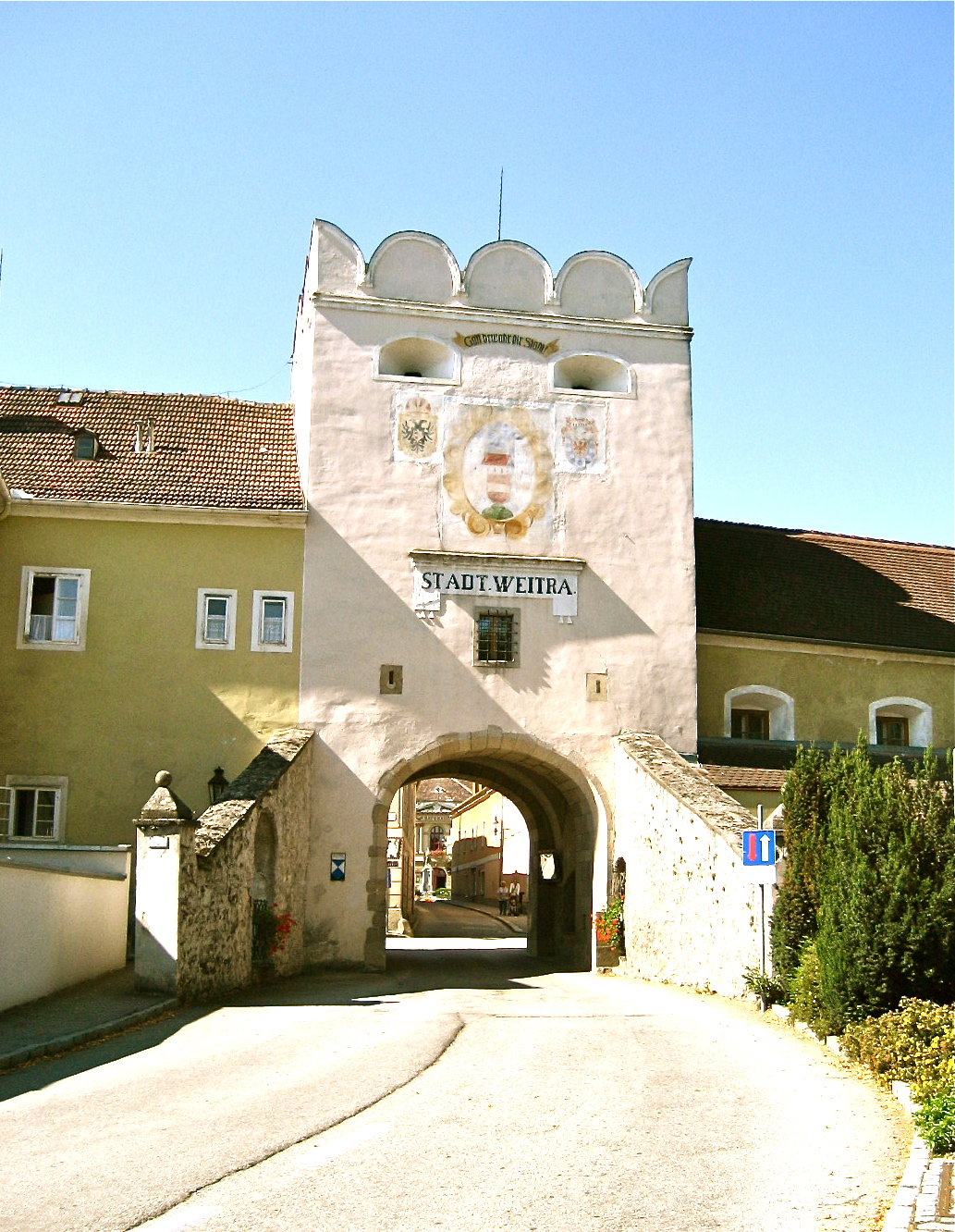
Oberetor Weitra

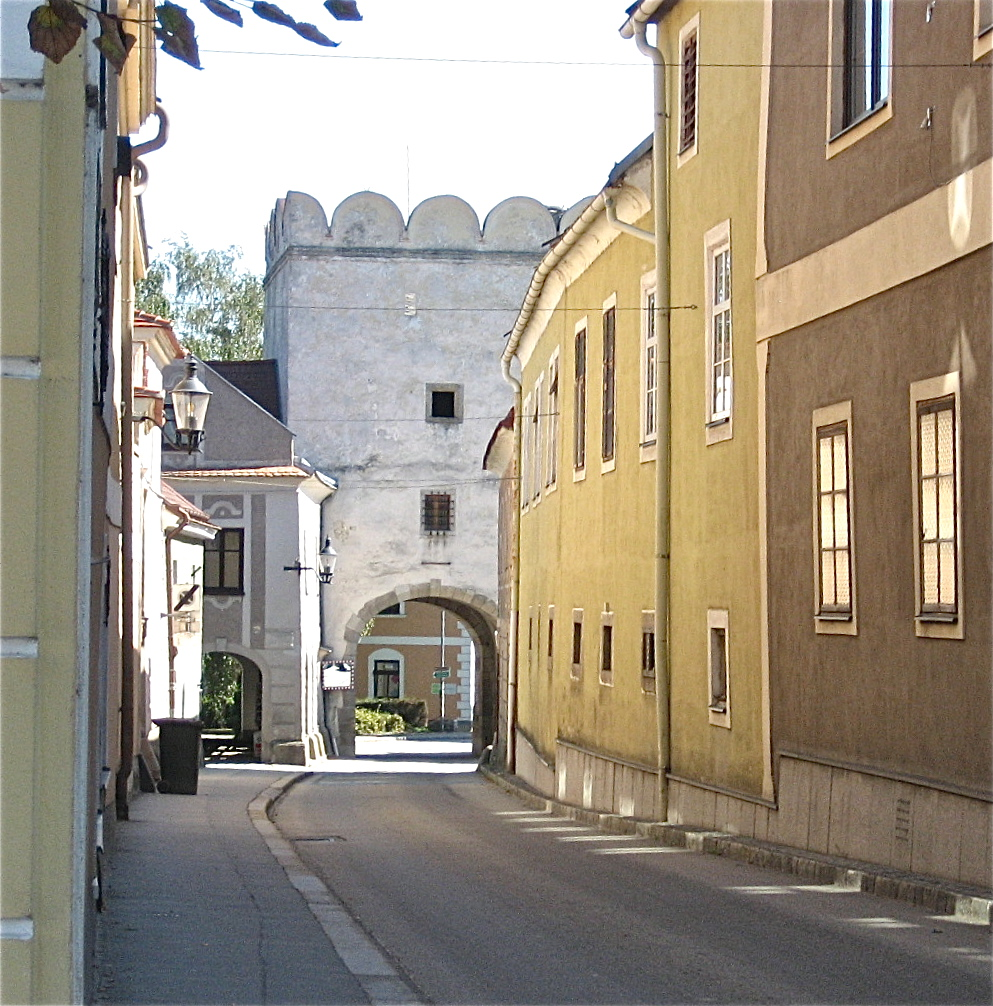
Oberetor Weitra

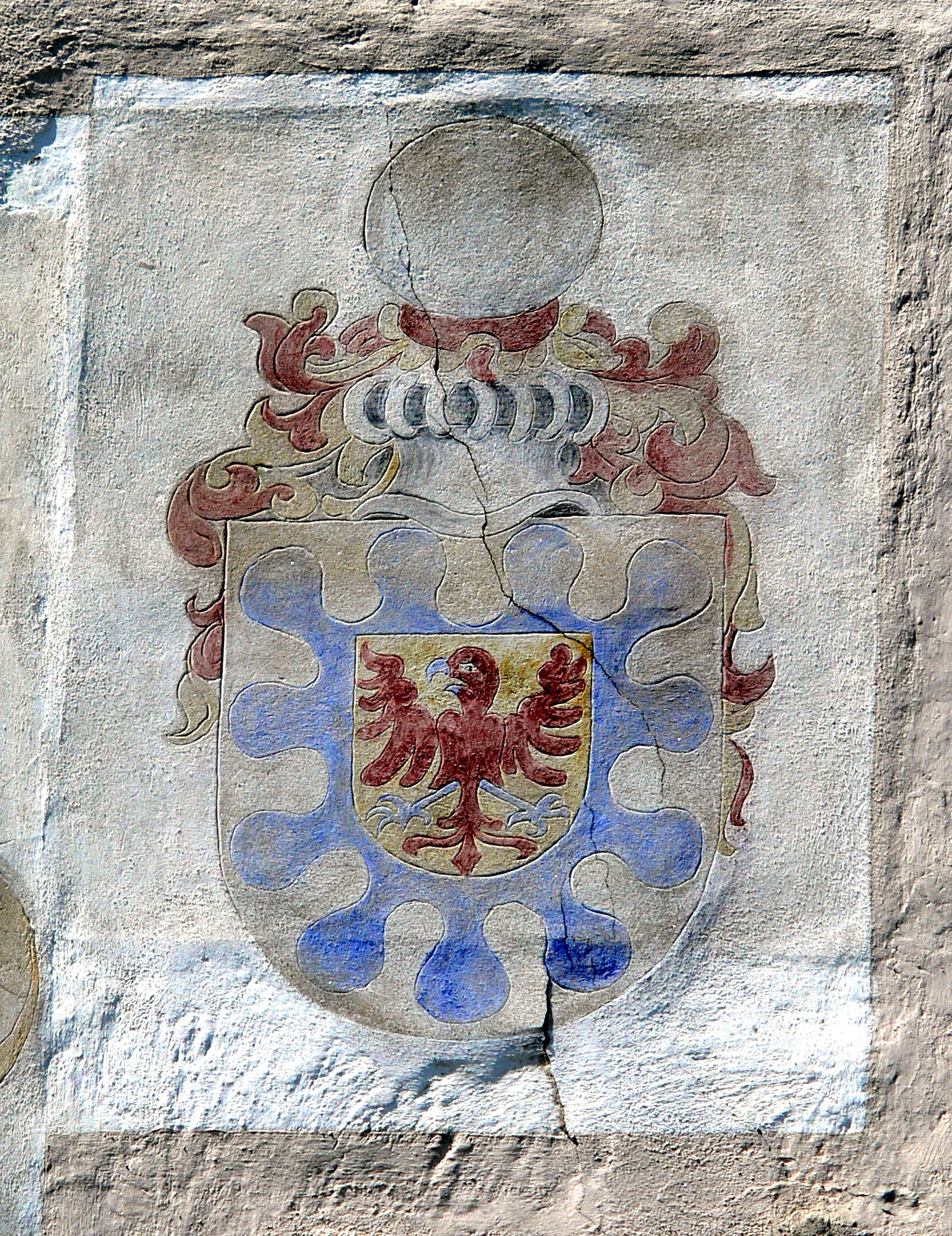
Weitra Oberes Tor - Wappen

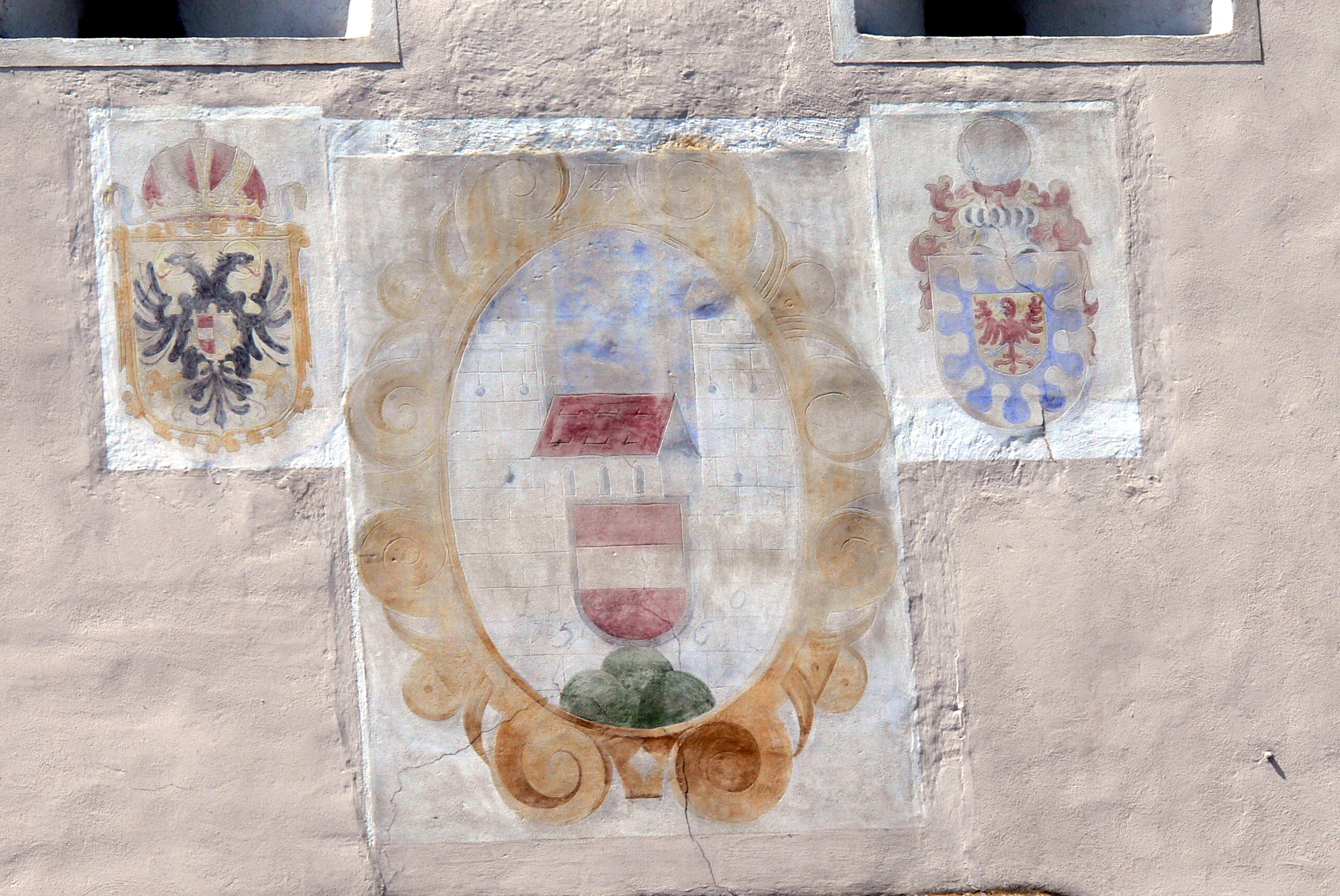
Weitra Oberes Tor - Wappen

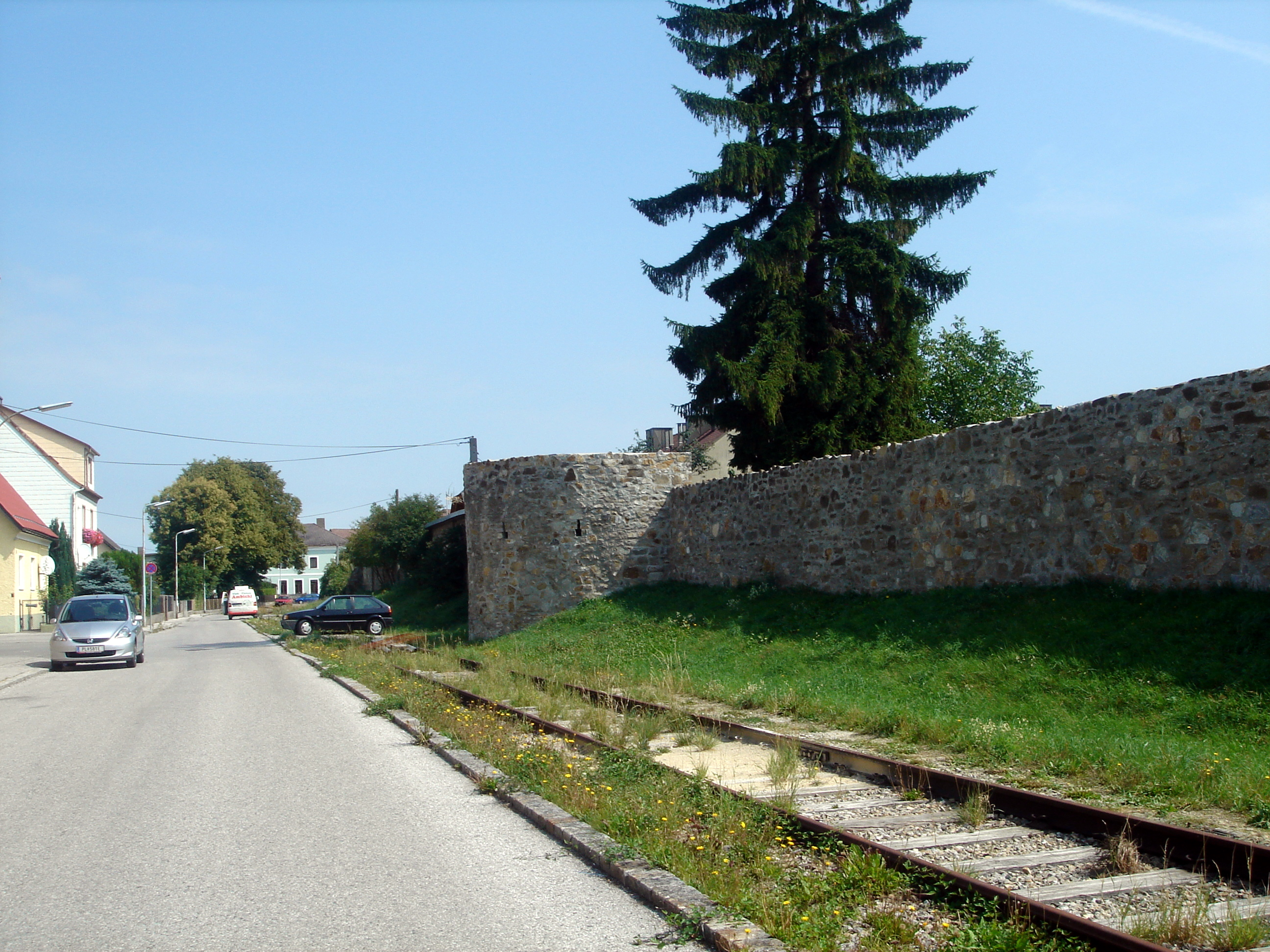
Wilhelmsburg Stadtmauer

- Wilhelmsburg was settled by the Bavarians before 850. In 1209 the Babenberg Duke Herzog Leopold VI, granted Wilhelmsberg to Stift Lilienfeld. The town wall was built after 1330.
- Ybbs an der Donau was an early wooden church was erected at Sarling by Ybbs in the 8/9th century. In 788 there was a battle between the Bavarians and Avars at Ybbs. Ybbs was walled along the Danube frontage, with a square tower at the northwest and a Round tower - which survives - at the SE. The defences fronting the Danube are well depicted in Merian’s print of 1679. On the landward side the town was walled in a semi-circular arc with a moat. The gates do not survive, but the walls may still be incorporated in some of the houses.
- Zeiselmauer was not strictly a walled town. On the Danube. The Roman auxiliary fort was re-fortified by the Babenbergs in the 10th century, but never granted a market or charter.
- Zistersdorf was first mentioned in 1160 in the ownership of Albero III von Kuenring (c. 1115 – 1182). One of the five walled towns in Lower Austria that belonged to the Kuenringer family. The defensive circuit is almost ovoid in shape and initially was of the banked and palisaded. The town was walled about the same time as it received its charter in 1284. The castle was later added to the southwest and a large rectangular marketplace formed. All the gates have disappeared, but many lengths of wall survive, often incorporated in the backs of houses, especially on the Stadtgrabengasse. The Vischer print of 1672shows that on the southern side of the town there was a simple crenellated wall with lower gun-ports and an east gate-tower. Property boundaries to the north - Stadtgrabengasse, suggest a wide ditch or moat on that side.
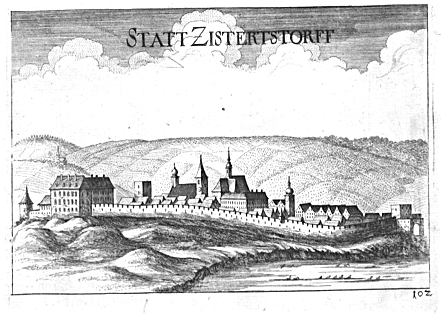
Zisterdorf in 1672 (Vischer)

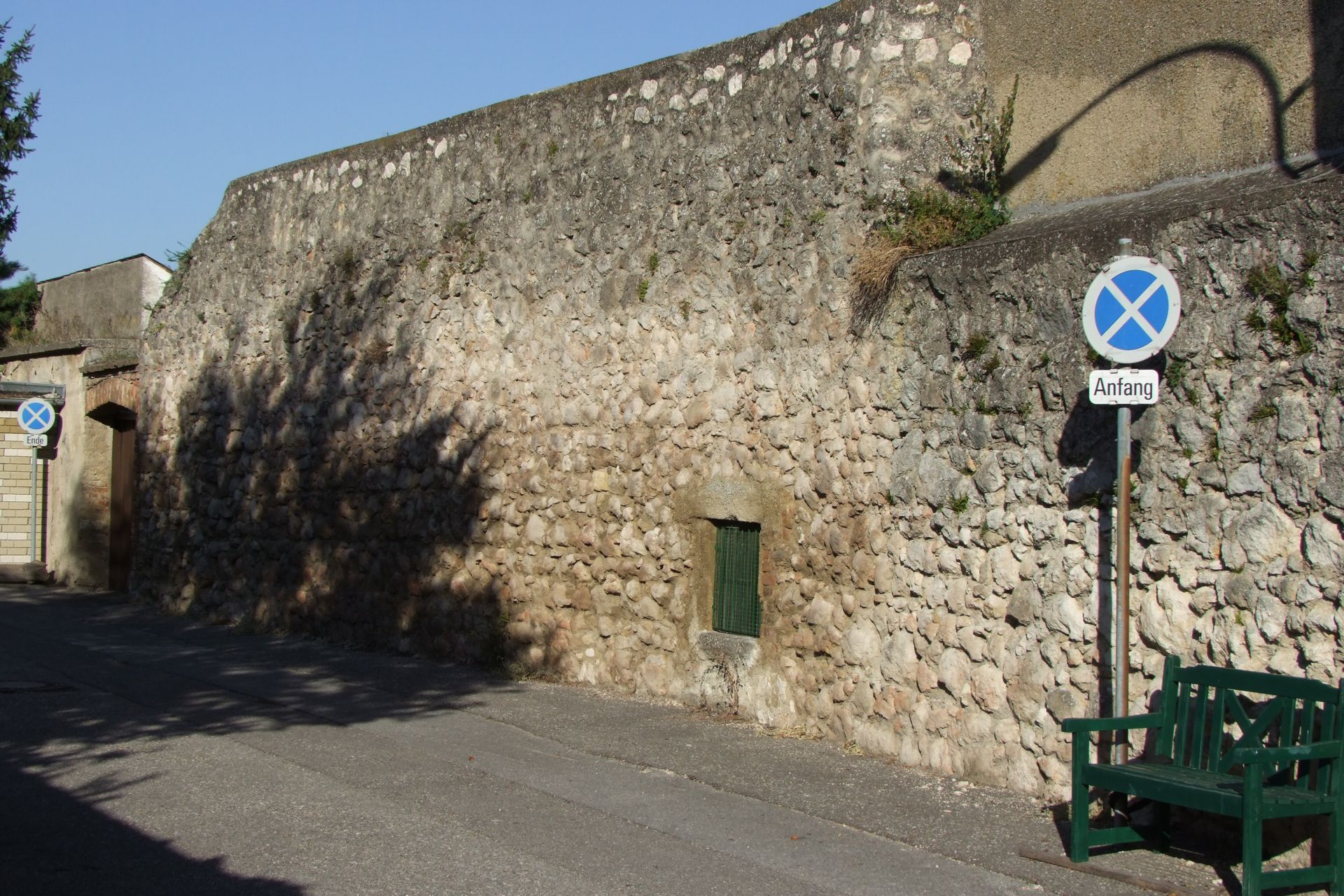
Zistersdorf Stadtmauer
- Zwettl appears to be one of the earliest chartered towns of Austria. The citizens were granted stadtrecht by Duke Leopold on 28 December 1200. The town was a foundation of Kuenringers who had founded the nearby Zwettl Monastery in 1158. The name is a Slavic derived place name and the original Slavic settlement would have been the Propsteiburg immediately to the southwest of the NW. This would originally have been settled by the Kuenringer early in the 12th century. The Romanesque church and associated Karner (Channel House) date from about 1150.
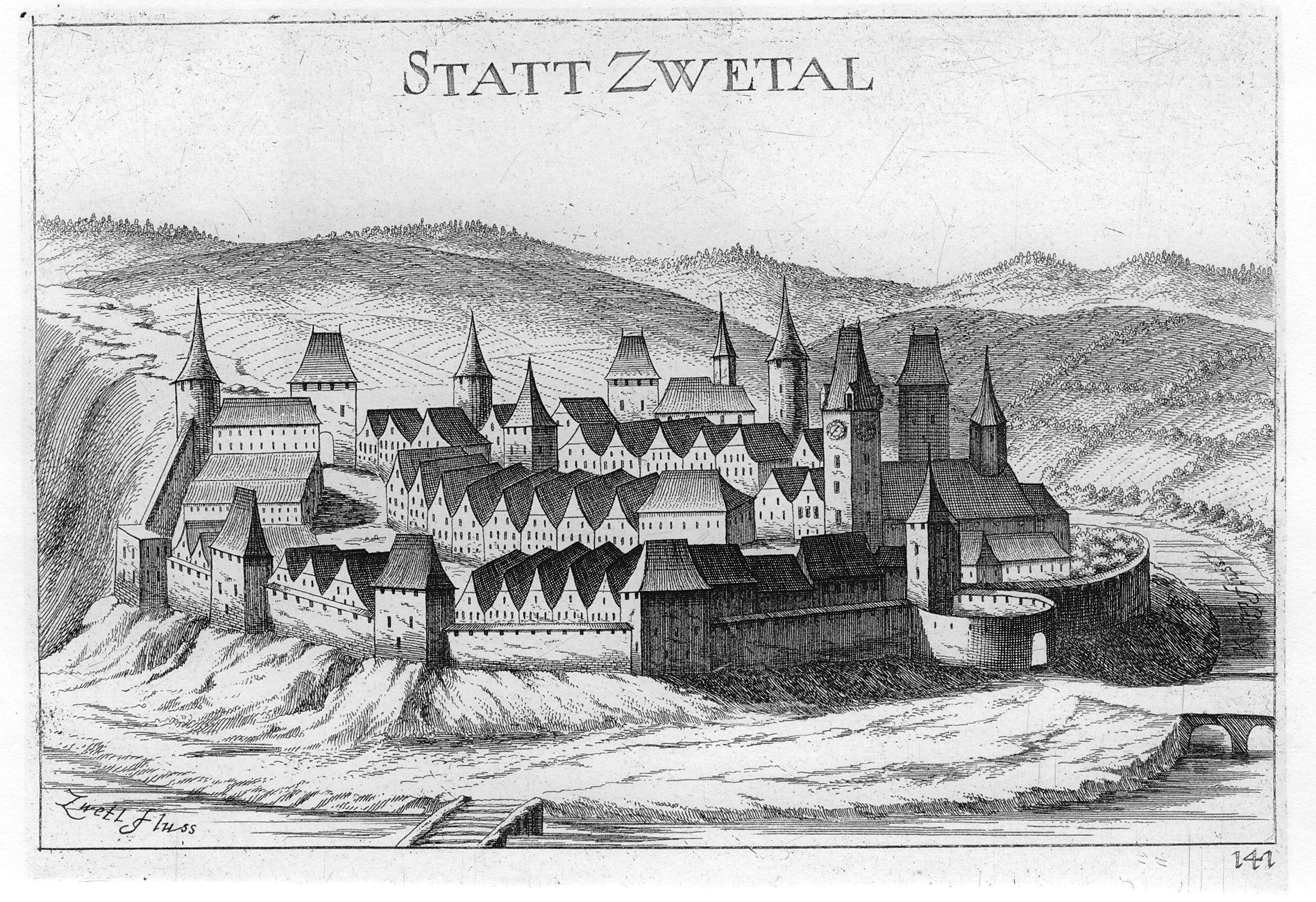
Zwettl, Lower Austria by Georg Mätthaus Vischer in 1672

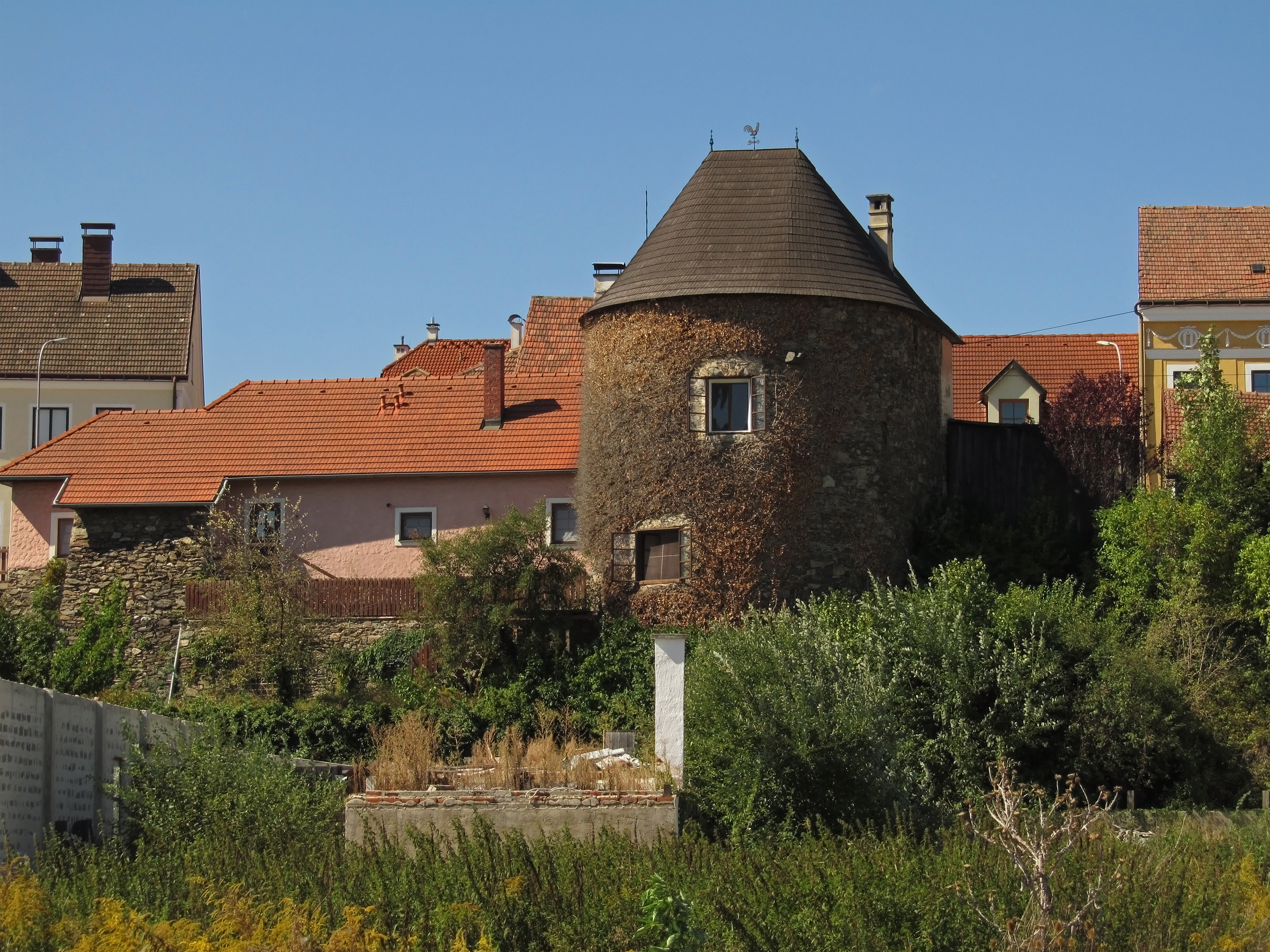
Passau Tower and Zwinger in Zwettl

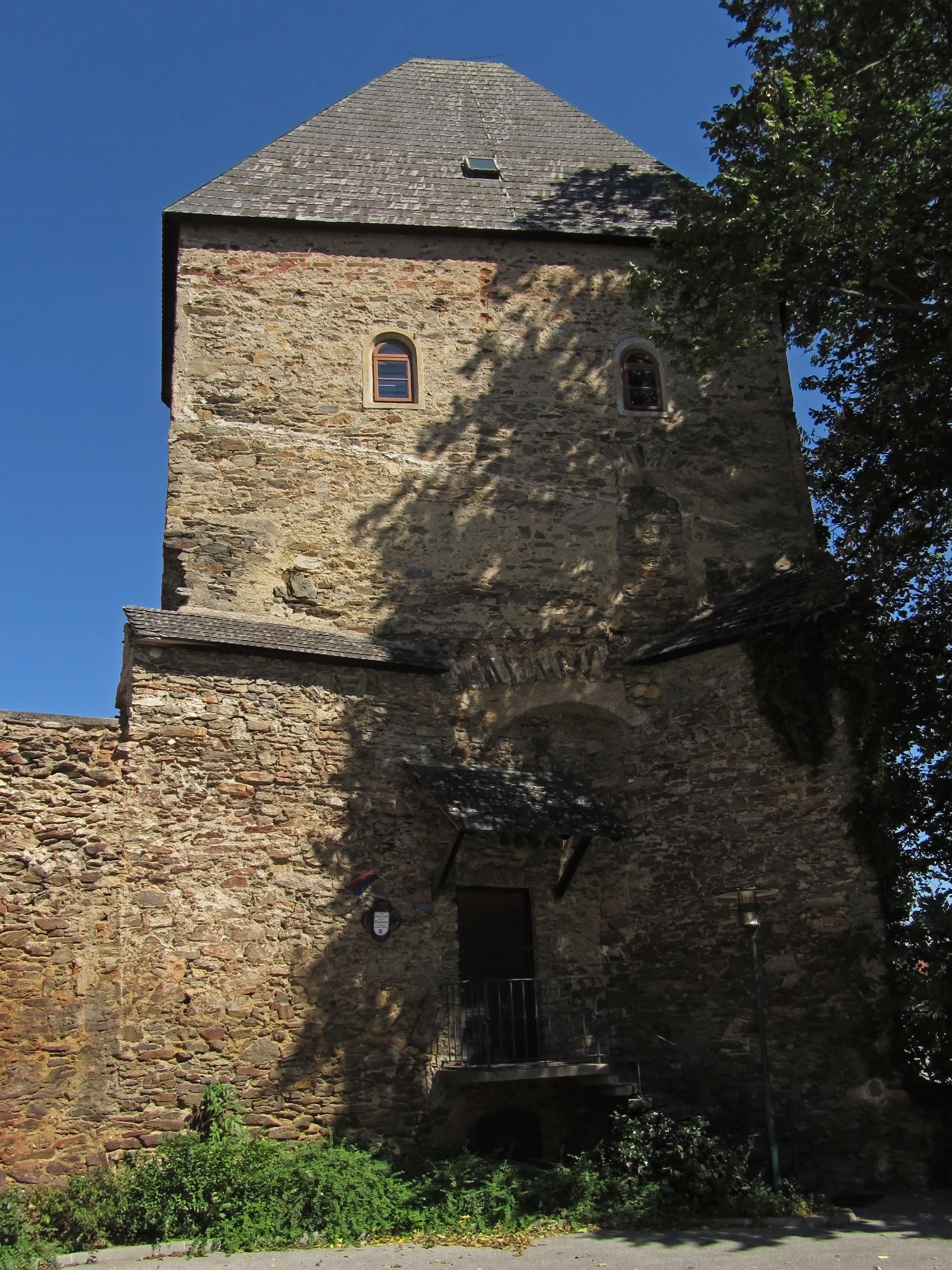
Schulturm in Zwettl

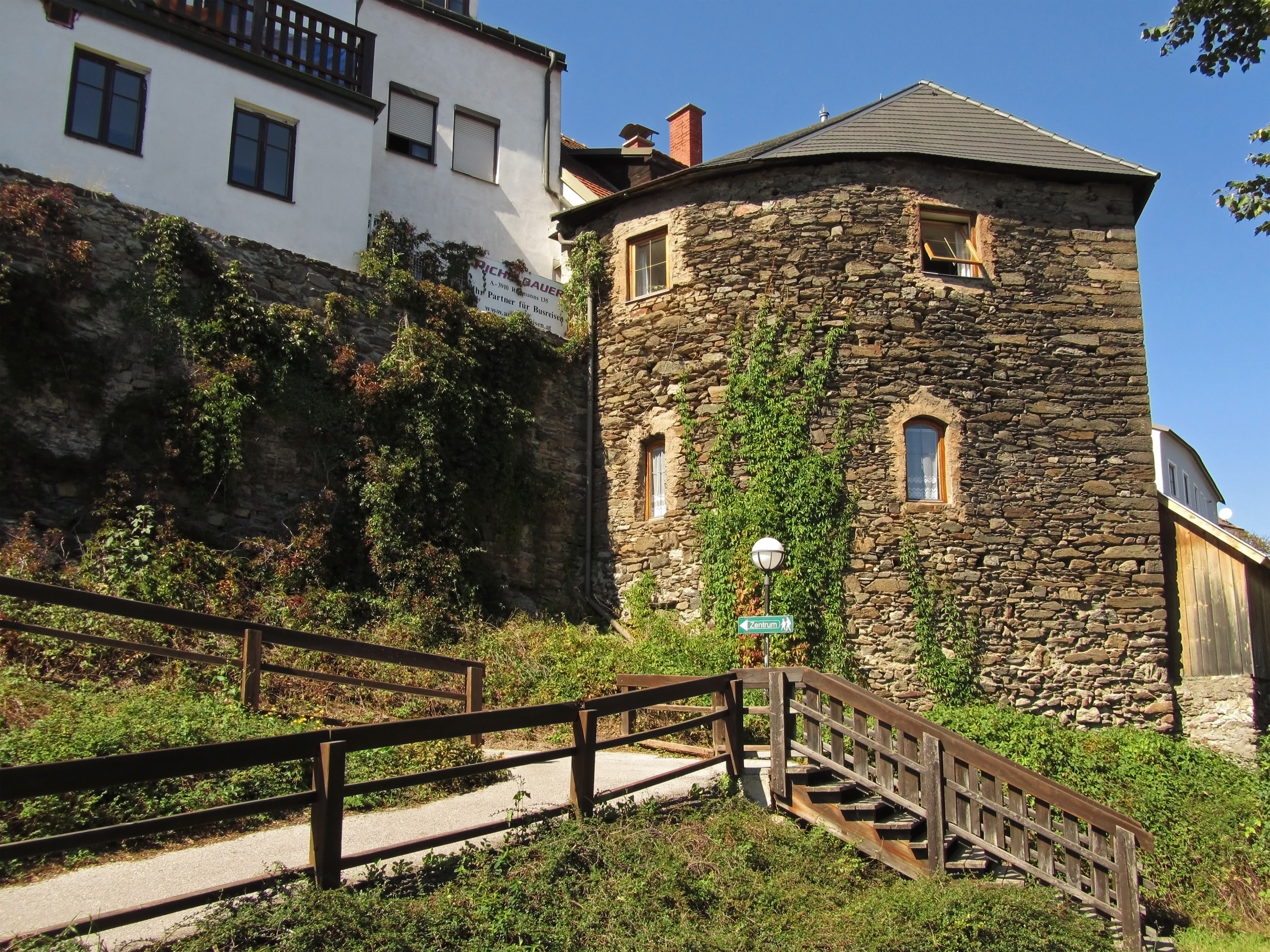
Stadtmauer bei Schulgasse 6 in Zwettl

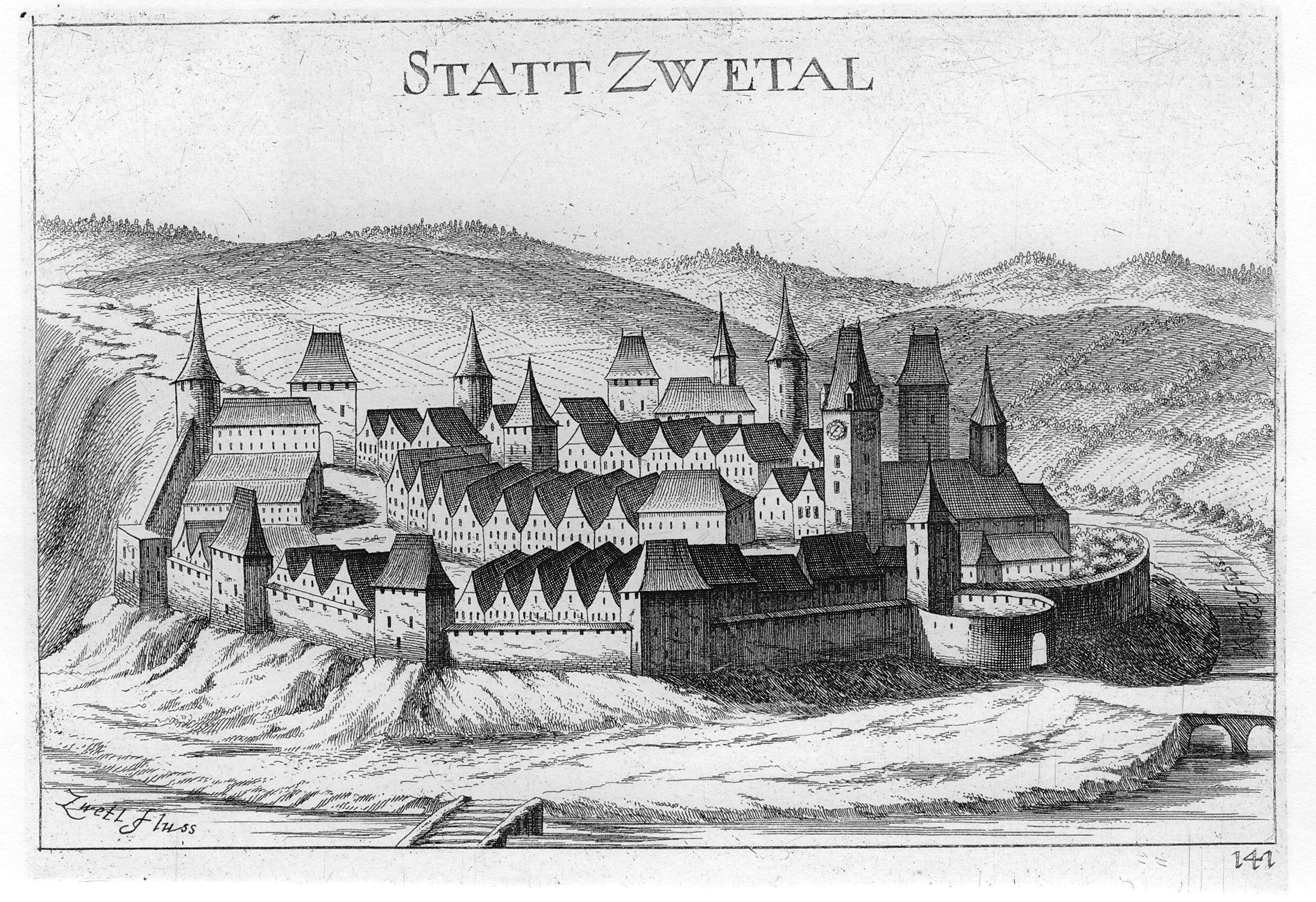
Zwettl im Waldviertel um 1672

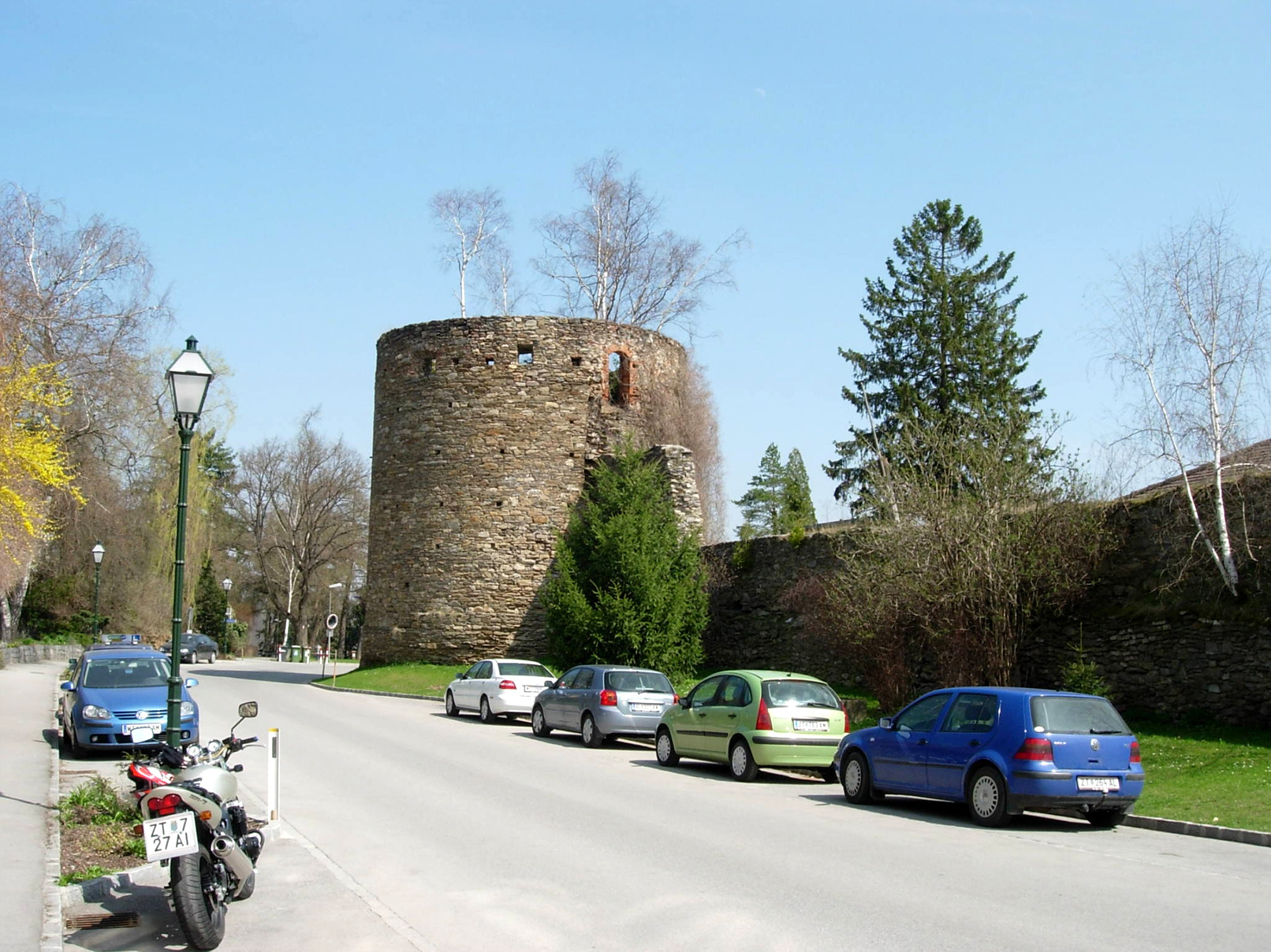
Sattigturm

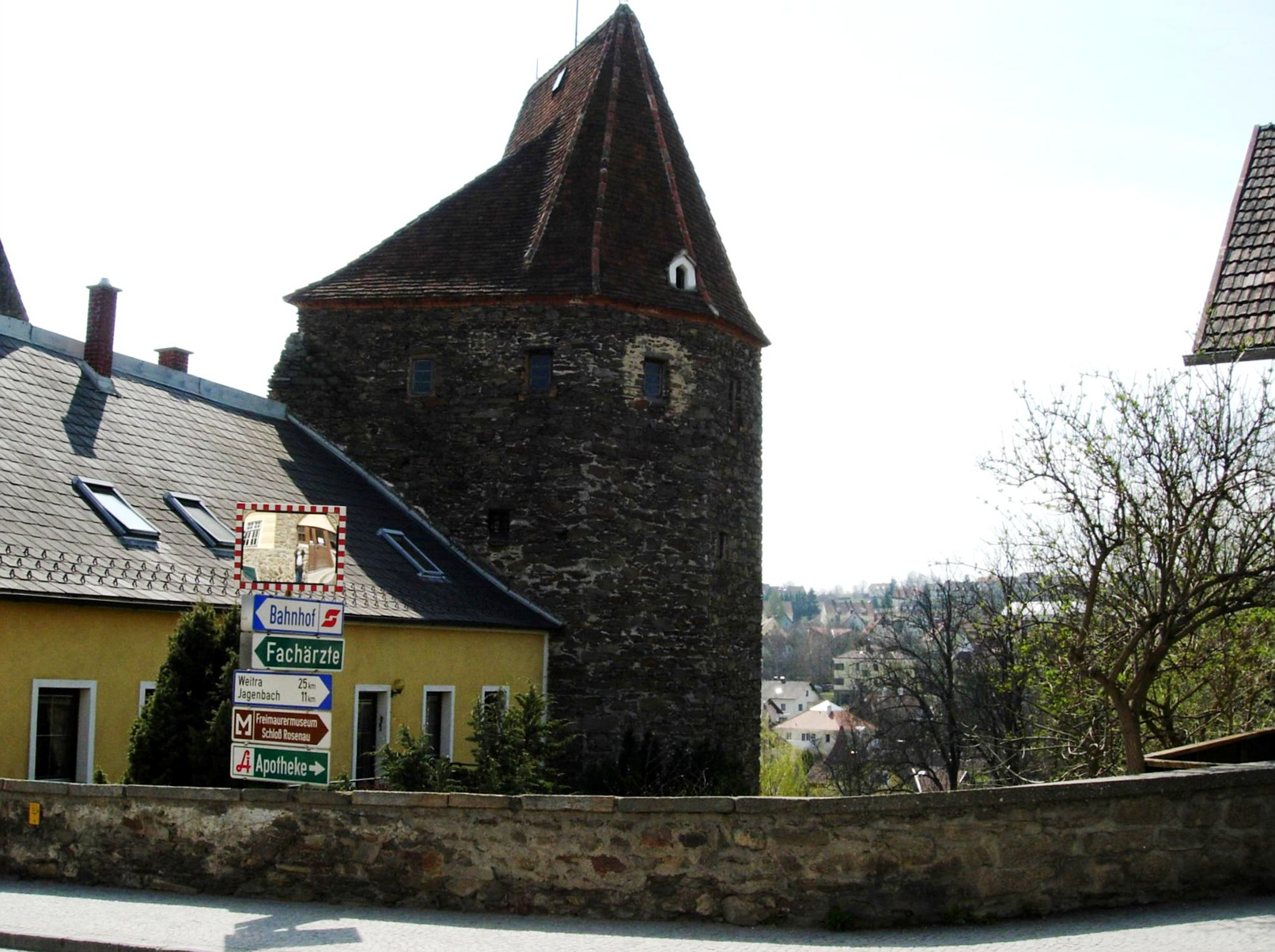
Antonturm

=== Salzburg state (Land Salzburg) ===
- Hallein was a major centre of Salt production first noted in 1198. The town walls were built before 1300 and the almost rectangular town layout is sandwiched between the river Salzach and the higher ground to the east. The layout is clearly shown by a model of 1792 now in Salzburg Museum. Most of the walls have disappeared. The Greistor gate remains as well as lengths of wall
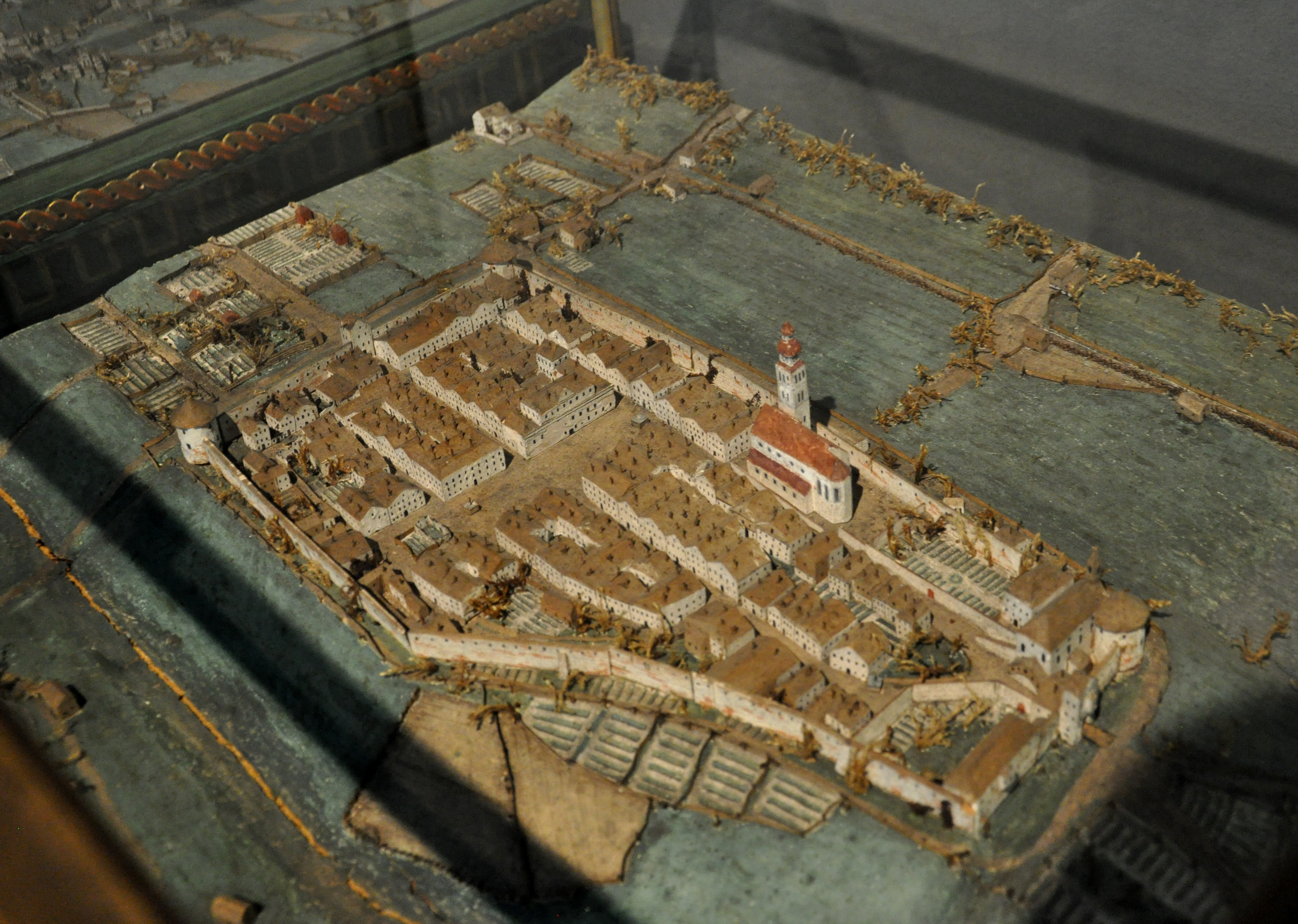
Model Hallein

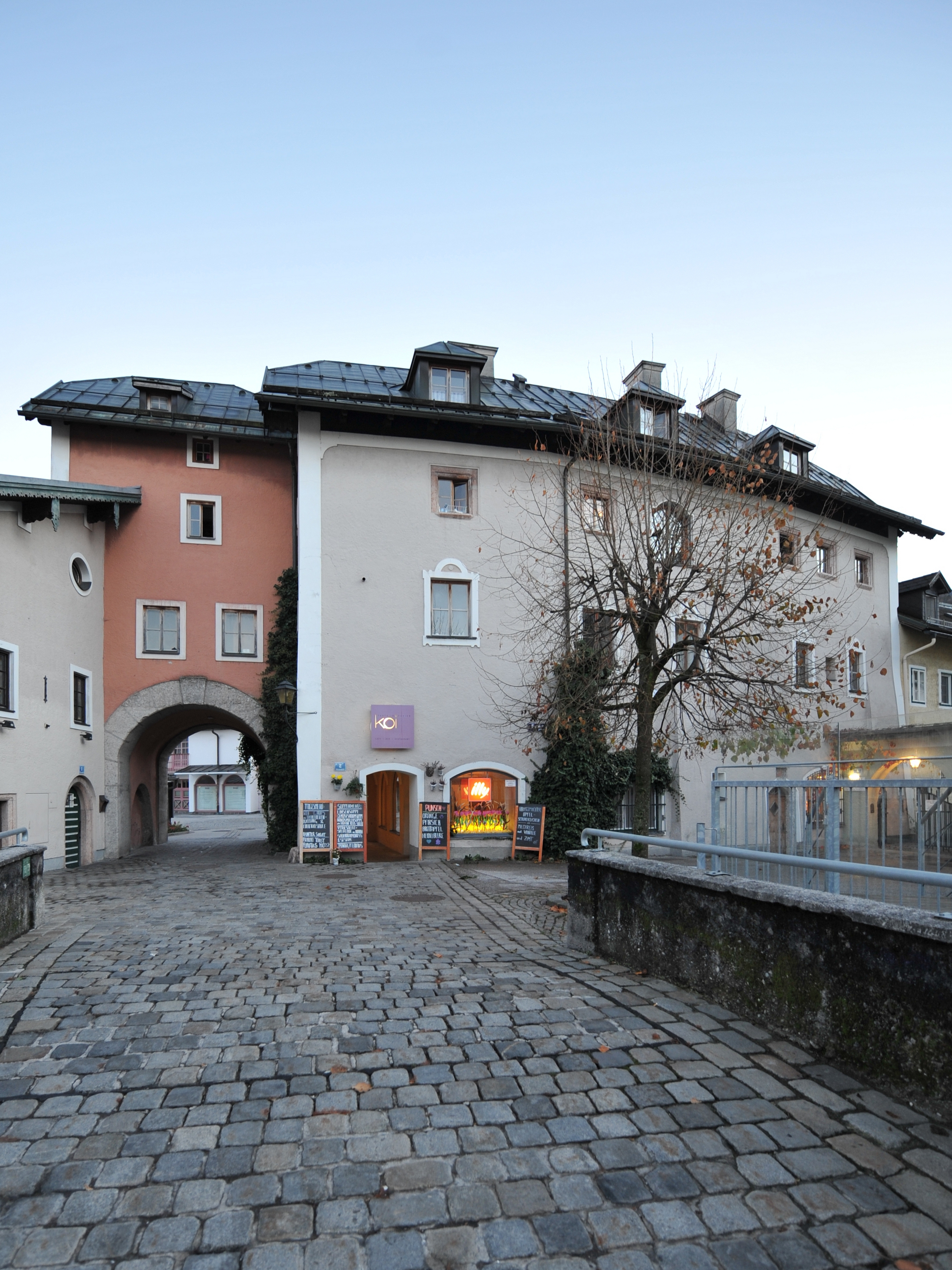
The Griestor Gate, Hallein Schanzplatz
- Neumarkt am Wallersee. Laid out as a planned town for Archbishop Eberhard II of Salzburg around 1240 and referred to as ‘Novum Forum’. It was a strategically important position on the northwest boundary of Archdiocese and initially appears to have been commercially successful, but the medieval layout does not appear to have survived, In 1638 the Salzburg Cathedral architect Santino Solari was commissioned to either fortify or re-fortify the site by the Archbishop Paris Graf von Lodron. The surviving evidence on the ground is slight. There seem to be two or three pointed Italian trace bastions to the north of the Church and another to the S. It might be some form of star fort, but quite possibly the fortifications were never completed.
- Radstadt. One of the best preserved walled towns in Austria. The area was originally settled in the 7th century by the Bavarians and in the 13th century the Archbishop of Salzburg founded a new town partly replacing the older settlement of Altenmarkt. It was in an important strategic position on the boundary of the Archbishop's territories with the Duchy of Carinthia. On July 27, 1289, Archbishop Rudolf von Hoheneck issued a charter giving the citizens of Radstadt – ‘Cives in Rastatt’ – those same town rights, privileges and liberties as were enjoyed by Salzburg, and exempted them from all taxes and duties for a period of ten years, with the exception of those expenses which were necessary for the fortification and defence of the town. This suggests that the town walls were built at this time. The settlement has a grid plan, originally with east and west gates and a rectangular N-S marketplace. In the 16th century the Archbishop refortified the town to counter the envisaged Turkish threat. Large round towers, three of which survive were added to the corners and a wide ditch on the north and W. An early 18th-century painting shows the wall to have been strengthened with buttresses, projecting gun emplacements added to the parapet walkway and lower casement slots for gun positions. The town still maintains its uniformed ‘Bürgergarde’ militia.
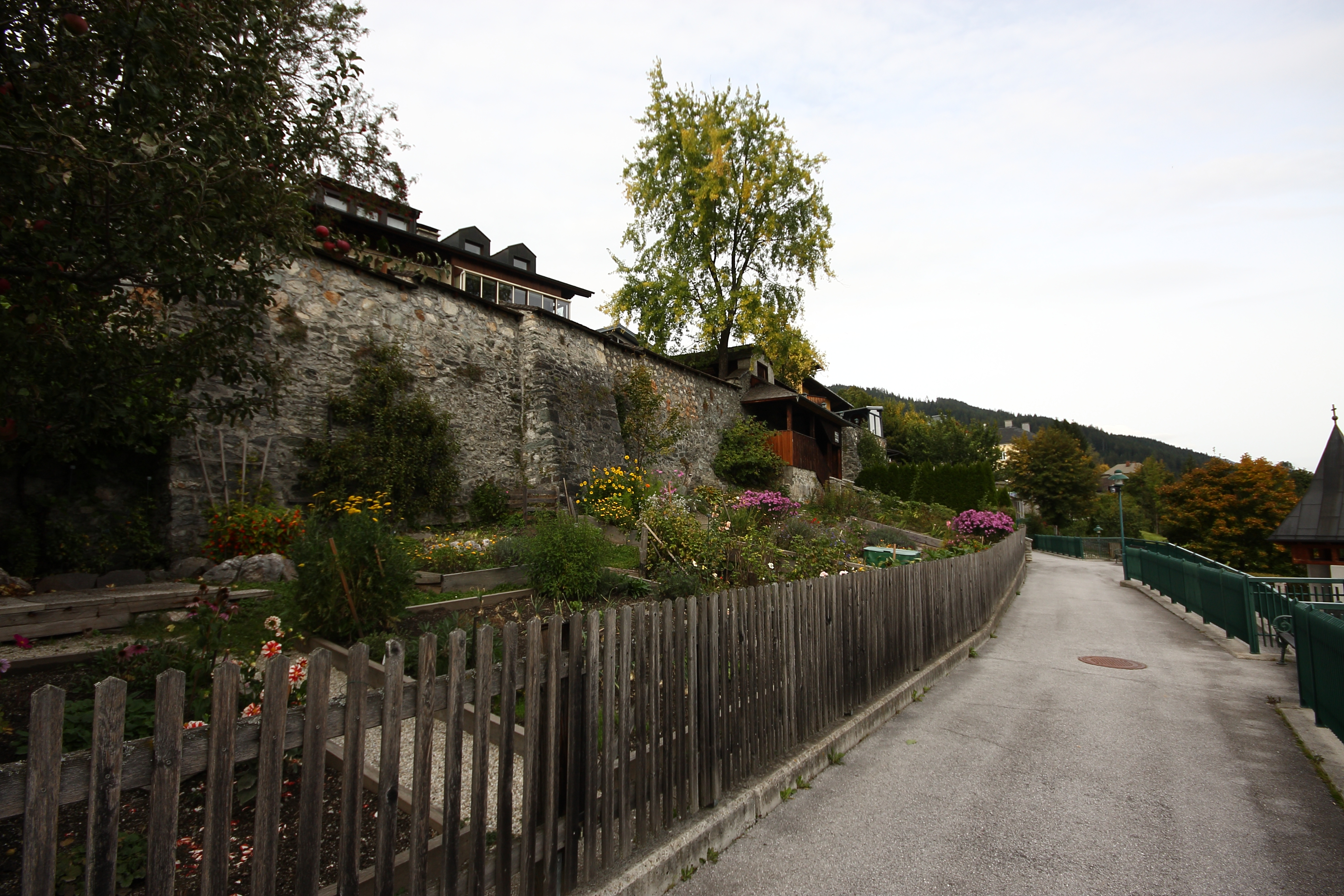
Town walls, Paris-Lodron-Gasse, Radstadt

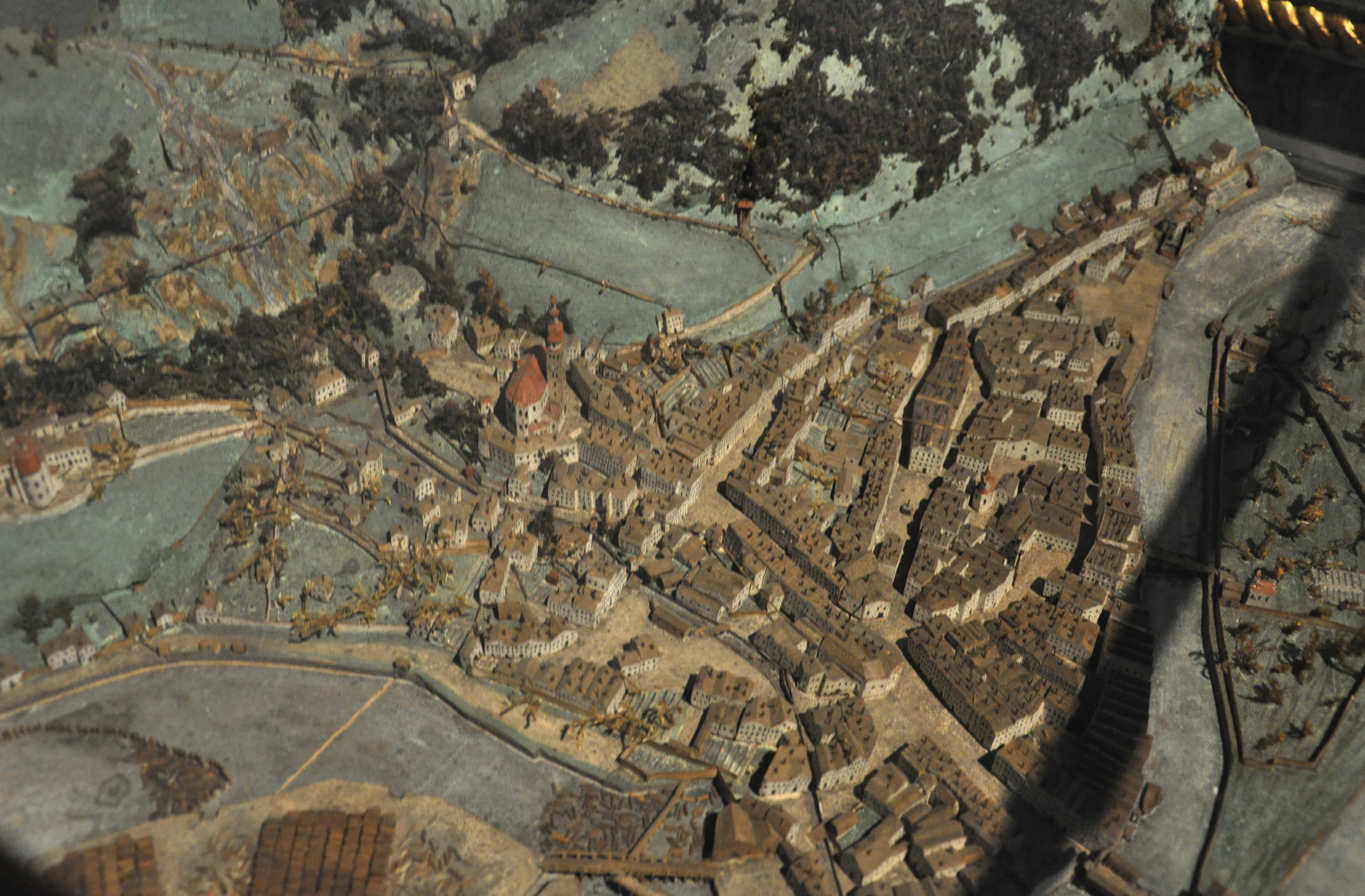
Model of Radstadt in Salzburg Museum

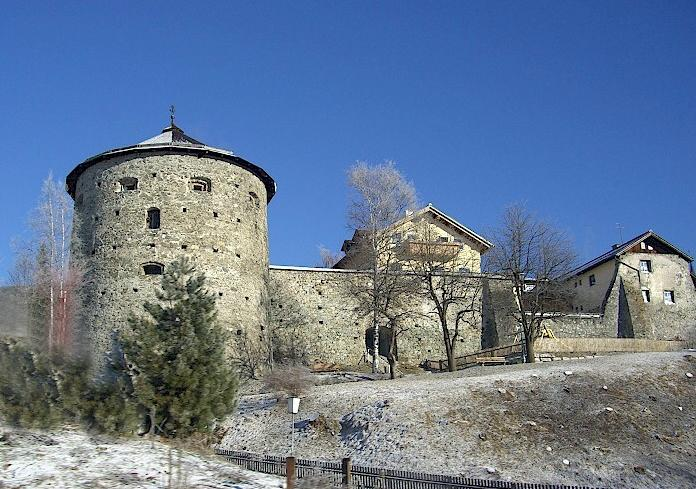
Hexenturm with town walls

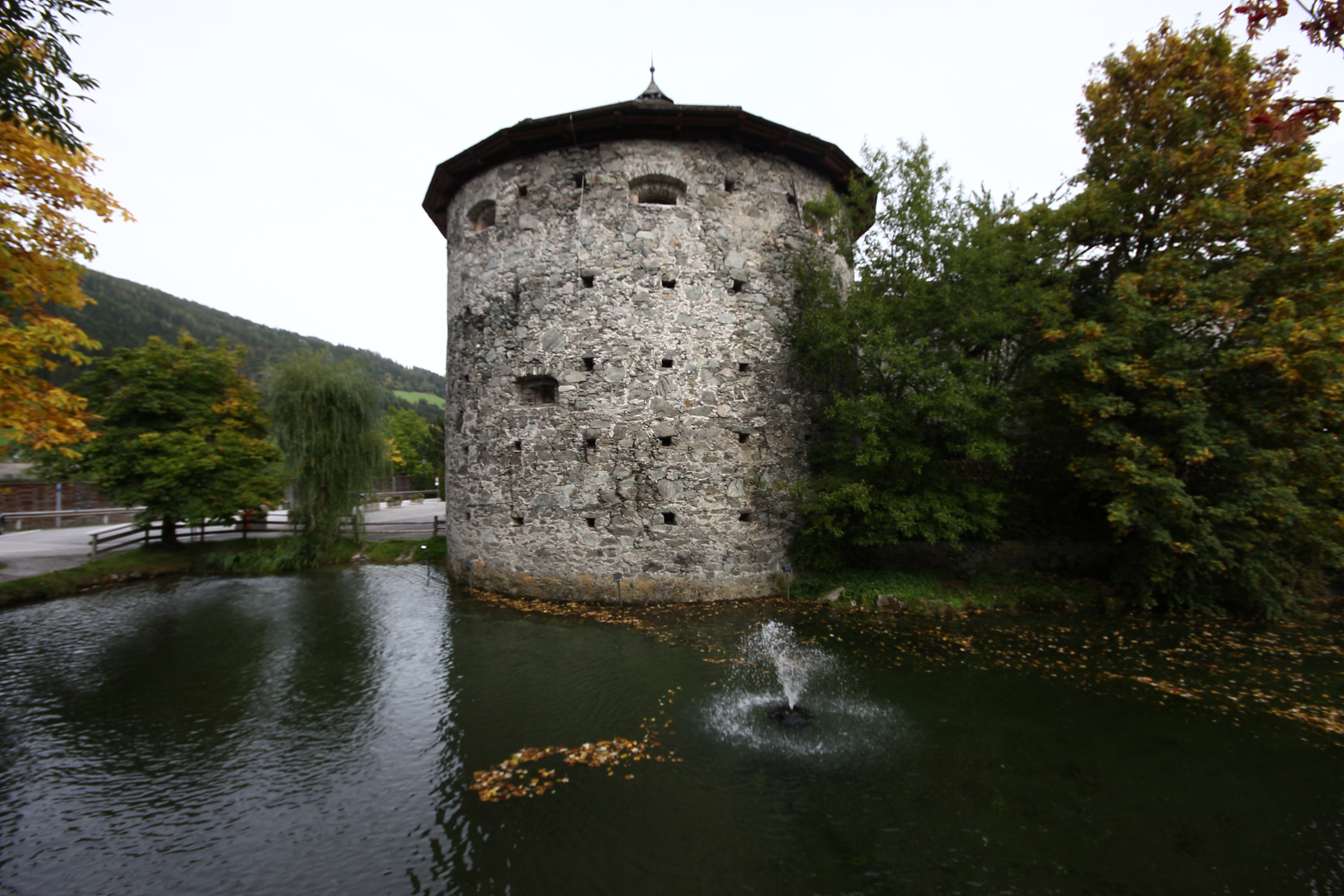
Färberturm Radstadt

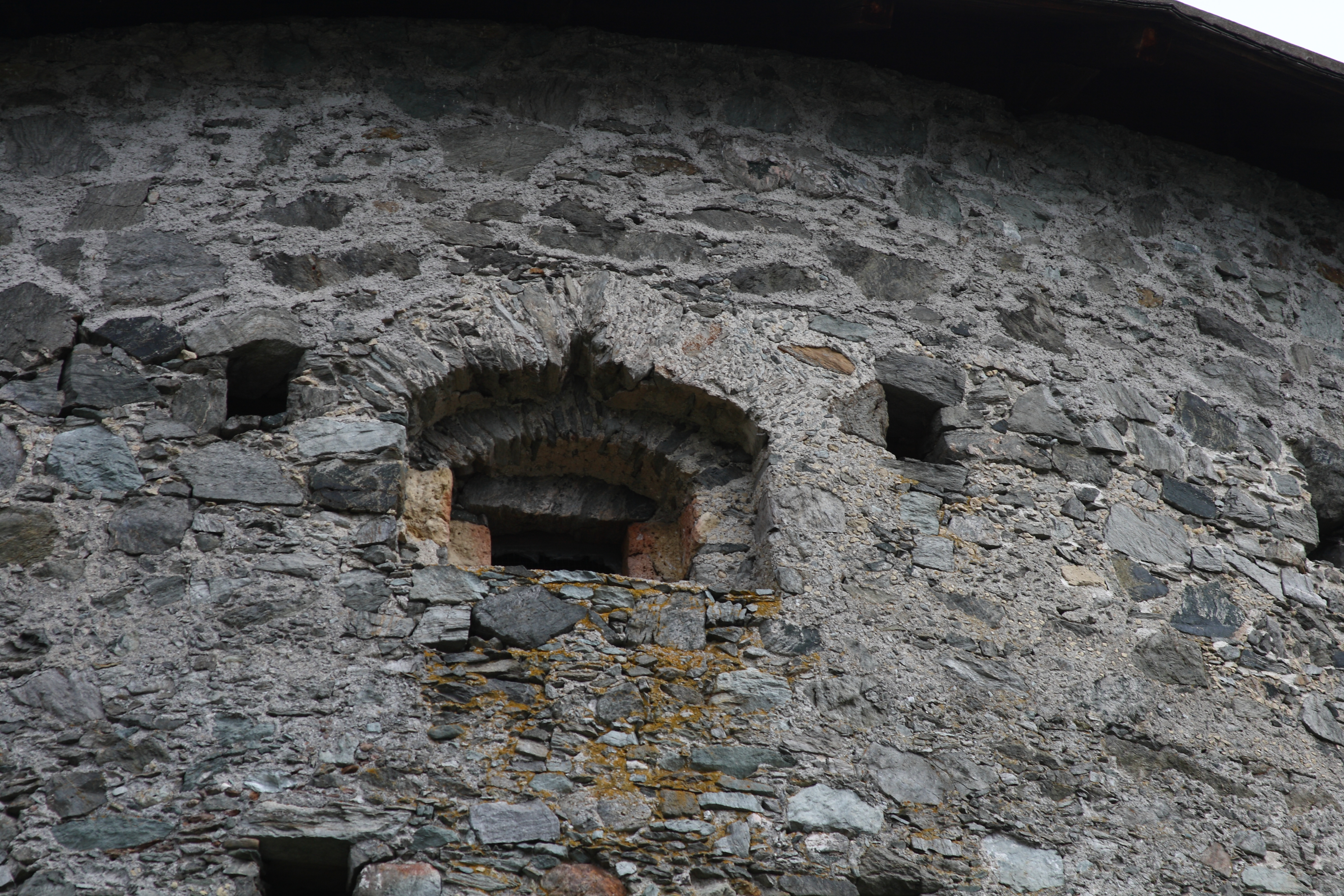
Hexenturm Radstadt

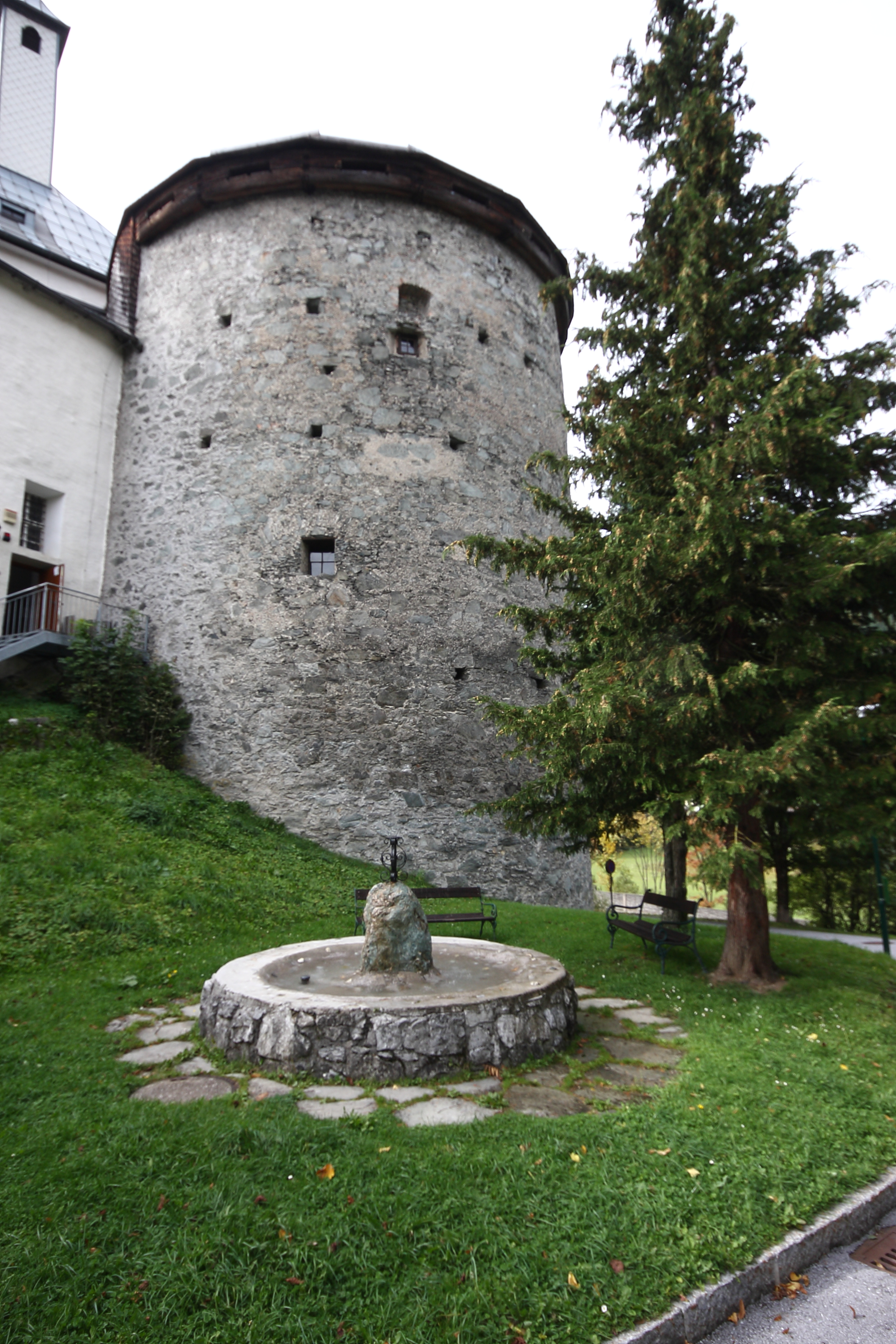
Kapuziner Tower, Radstadt

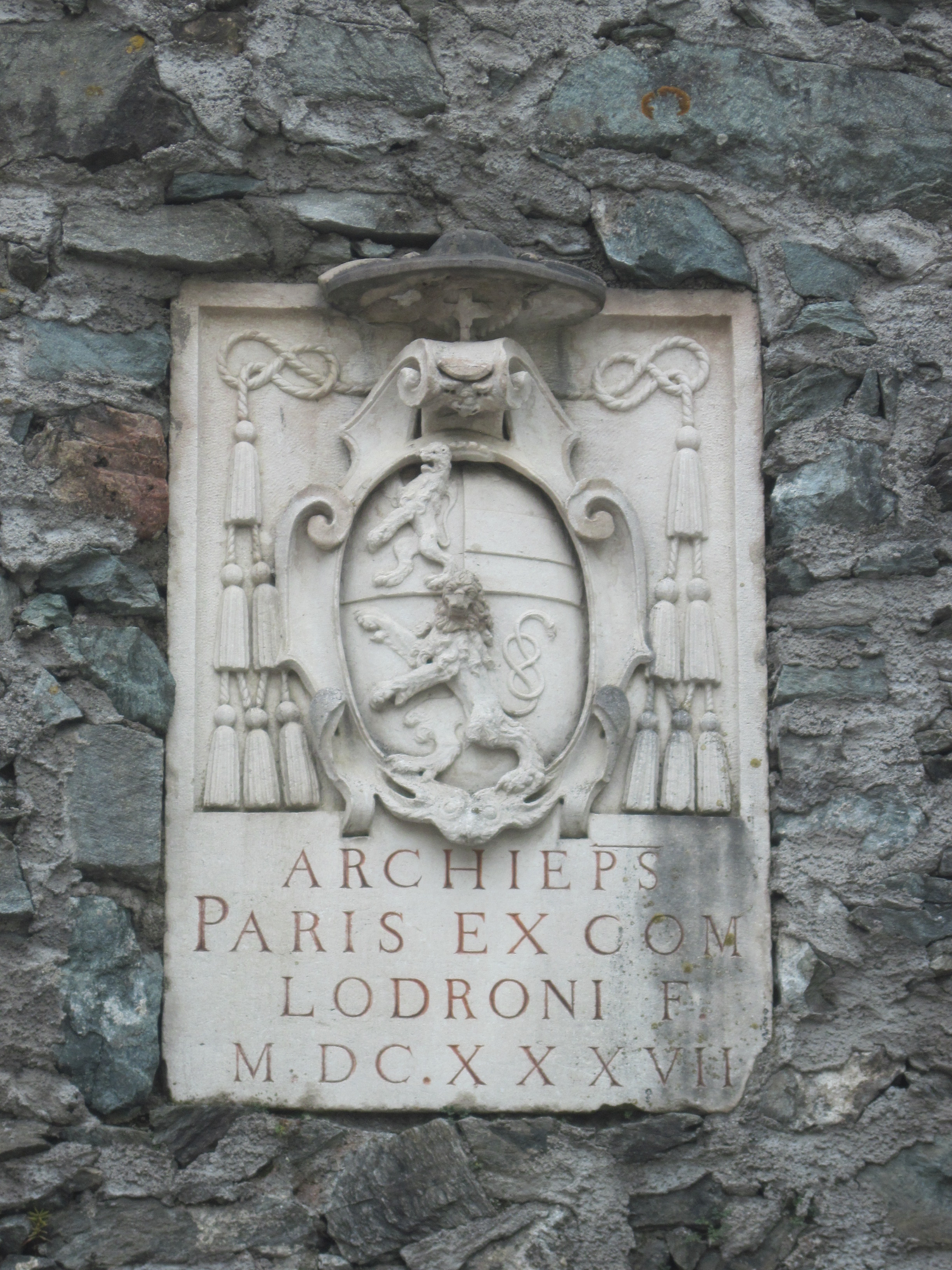
Town wall with Paris-Lodron Gedenktafel
- Salzburg municipality. The development of Salzburg is well documented with early prints. Hartmann Schedel in the Liber Chronicarum of 1493 shows the walled Altstadt (Old Town) below Hohensalzburg Fortress. The Altstadt is joined by a bridge across the Salzach river to a smaller settlement around the Platzl. Another view of Salzburg in 1565, which belonged to St Peter's Abbey, shows the Altstadt from the Kapuzinerberg on the other side of the Salzach. This shows that houses had now been built along the Quay in front of the old wall. On the NW, the old wall dating from the 11–12th centuries started with the Niederlegturm bastion and then to the Schleifertor or Westertor Gatehouse near the Museum Platz, before turning back before the Mönchsberg. Fortifications including a watchtower are shown along the crest of the Mönchsberg to the Hohensalzburg Fortress. To the southeast of the Quay there is Kumpfmülhltor water-gate and Nonntaltor gatehouse before the wall returns to Hohensalzburg Fortress around the Nonnberg Abbey. Just below Hohensalzburg Fortress is shown a large roundel tower, similarly positioned to those at Melk and Kufstein. This view is fairly similar to the less detailed view published by Braun and Hogenberg in 1572, which shows three additional gate-towers on the further side of the river around the Platzl. The city's walls were modified in the period 1465–1480, when rectangular fortified area with corner towers was added to the north of the Platzl. Then during the period 1620–1640 Santino Solari undertook an extensive remodelling of the defences for Archbishop Paris Graf von Lodron on both sides of the river. The defences around the Altstadt were extended with a wall all along the Salzach and to the N, and the taking in all the Monchsberg. On the other side of the river, around the Platzl and the Mirabell Palace, is a massive siege-works, in typical Italian fashion with four trace bastions and ravelins were built. Today this has largely disappeared with the exception of a bastion in the Mirabell gardens.
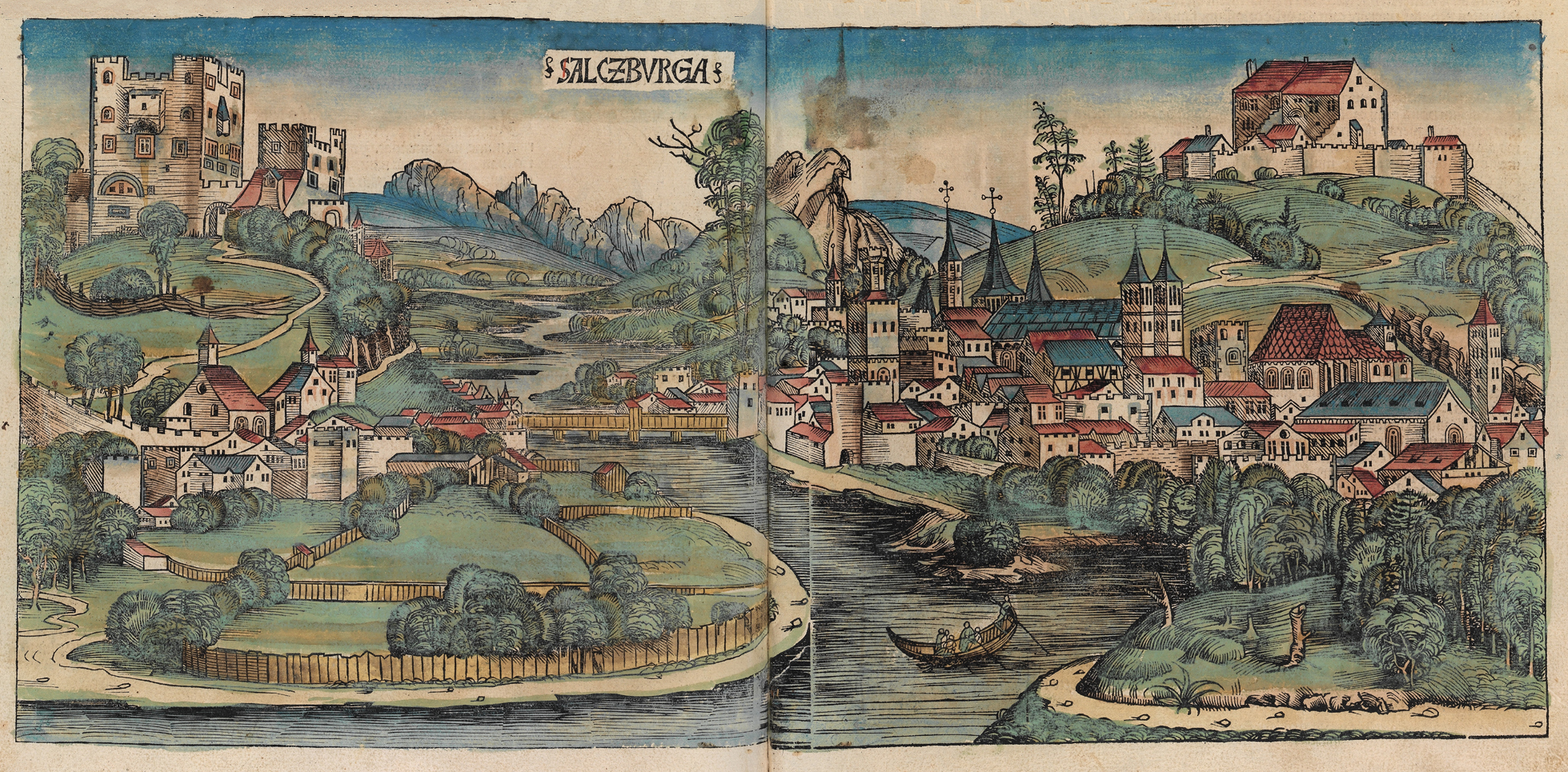
Hartmann Schedel view of Salzburg in the ‘Liber Chronicarum’ of 1493

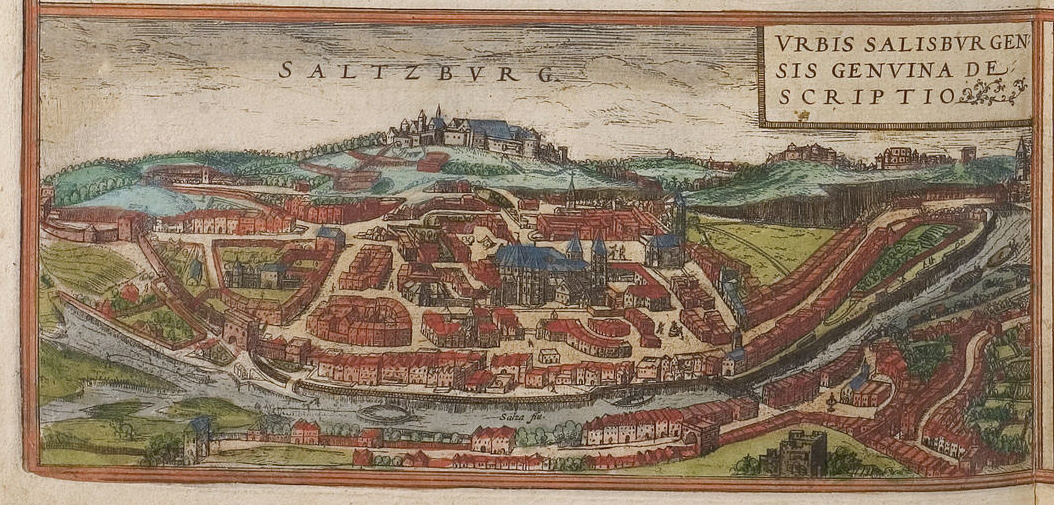
Braun and Hogenberg view of Salzburg 1572

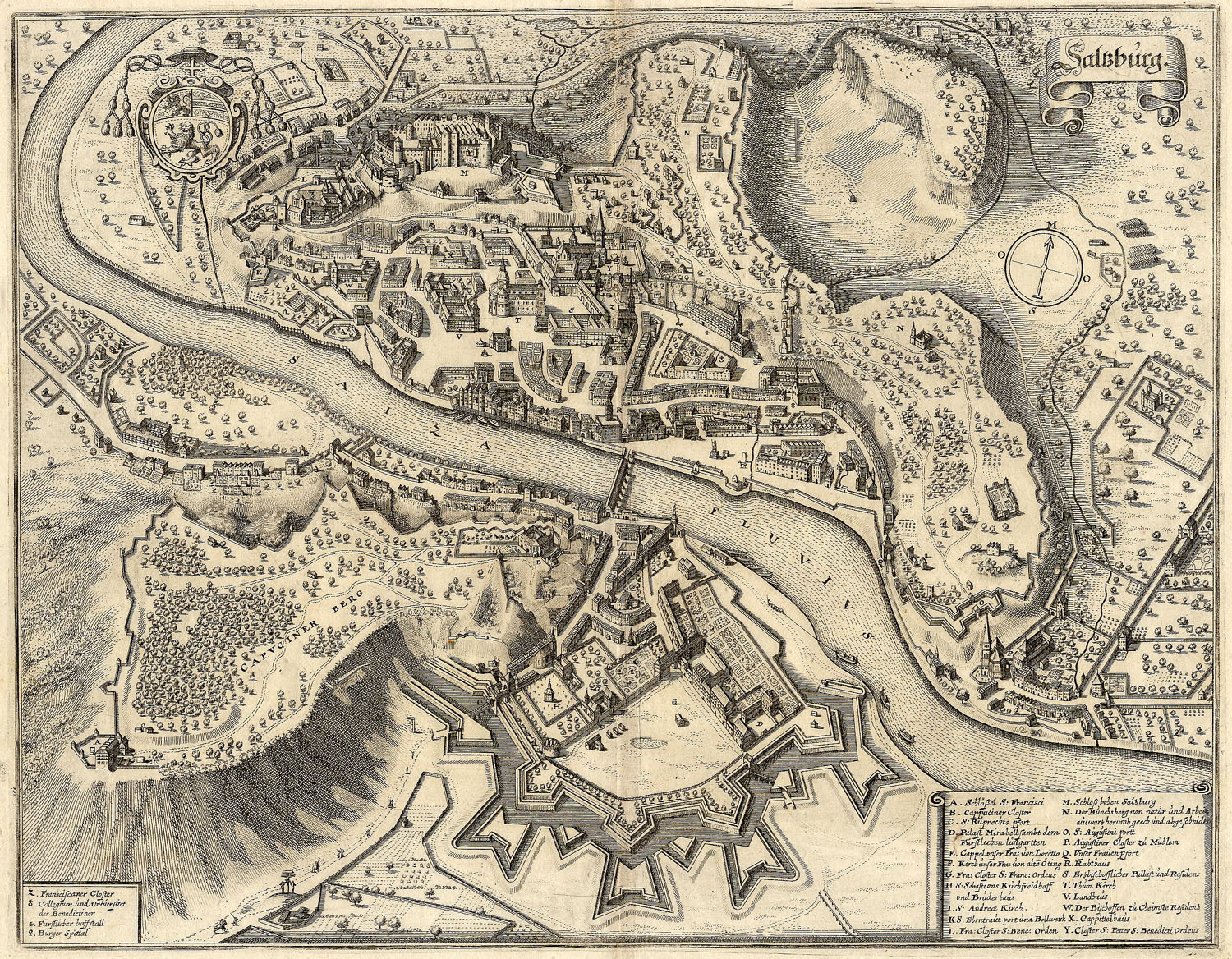
Merian Salzburg

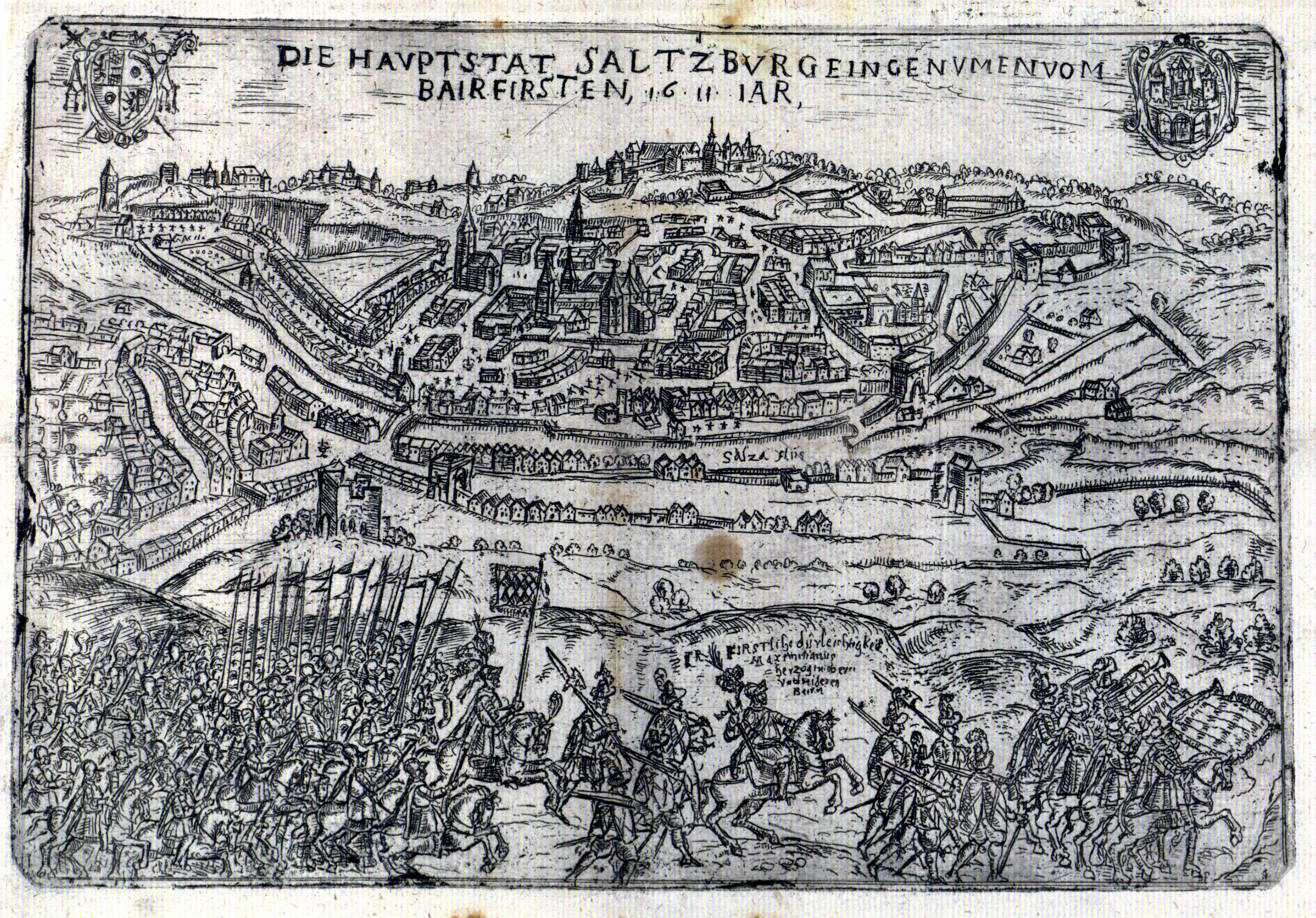
Die Hauptstat Saltzburg 1611

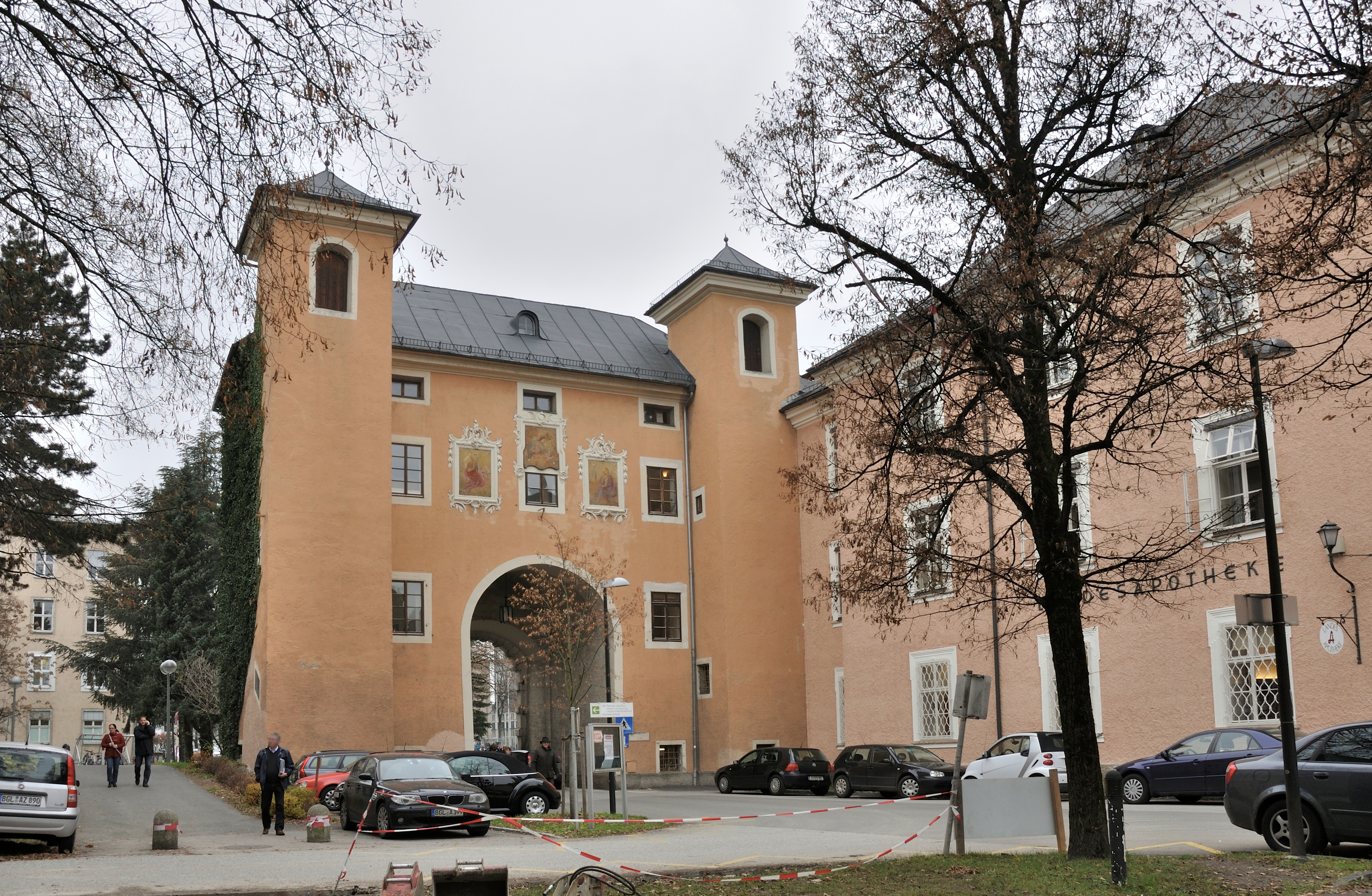
Salzburg Johannesspital Mühleggertor

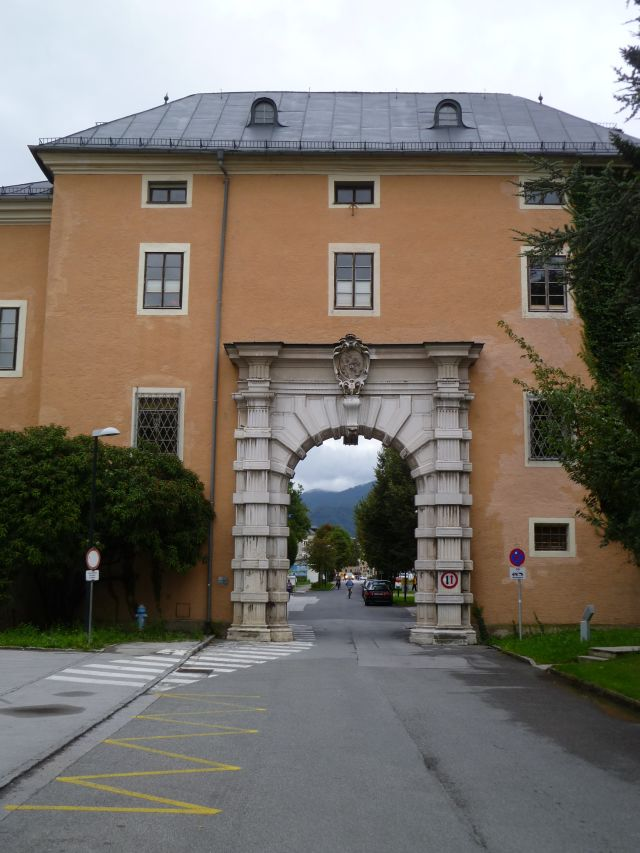
Müllegger Tor

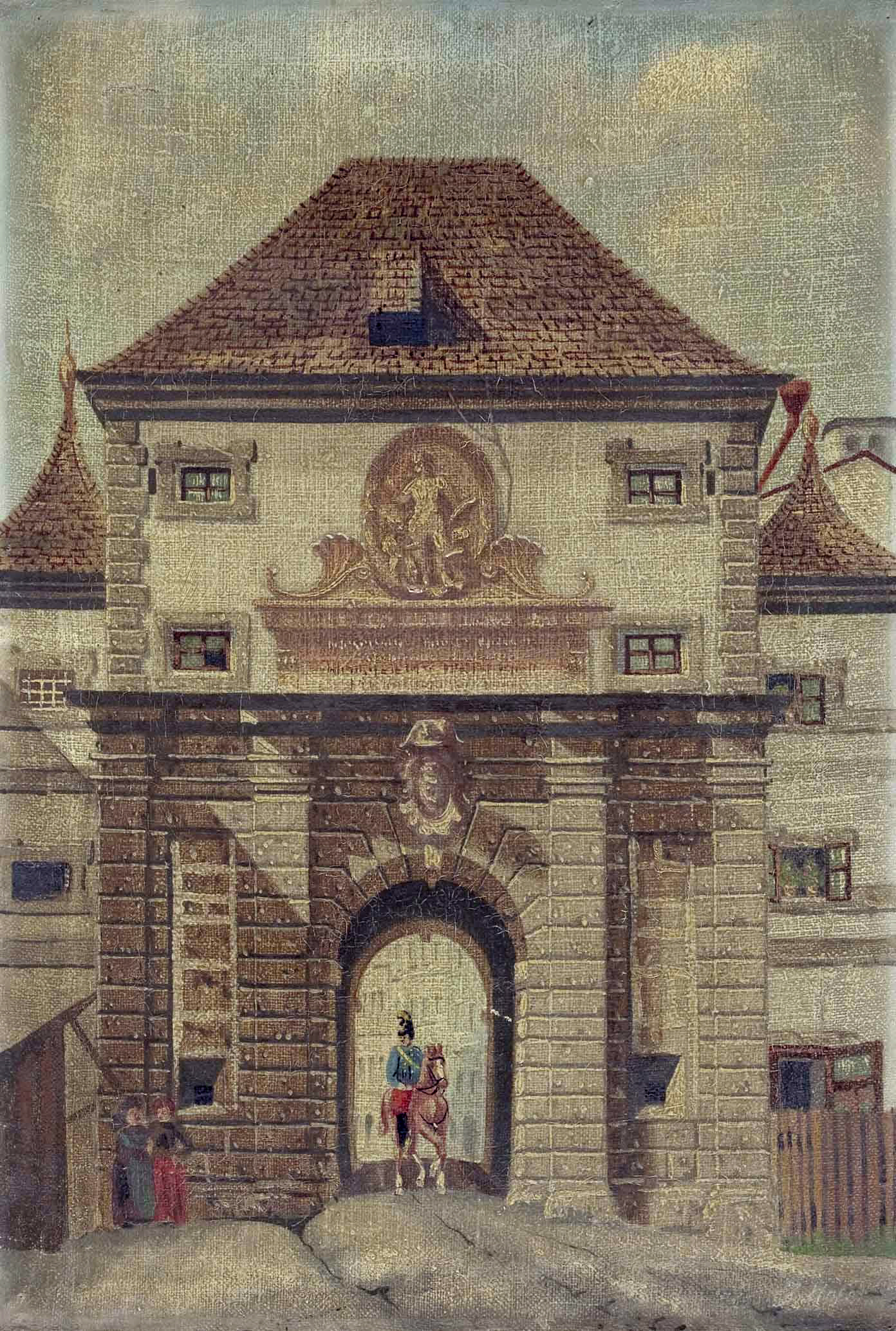
Salzburg Linzertor - demolished in 1894

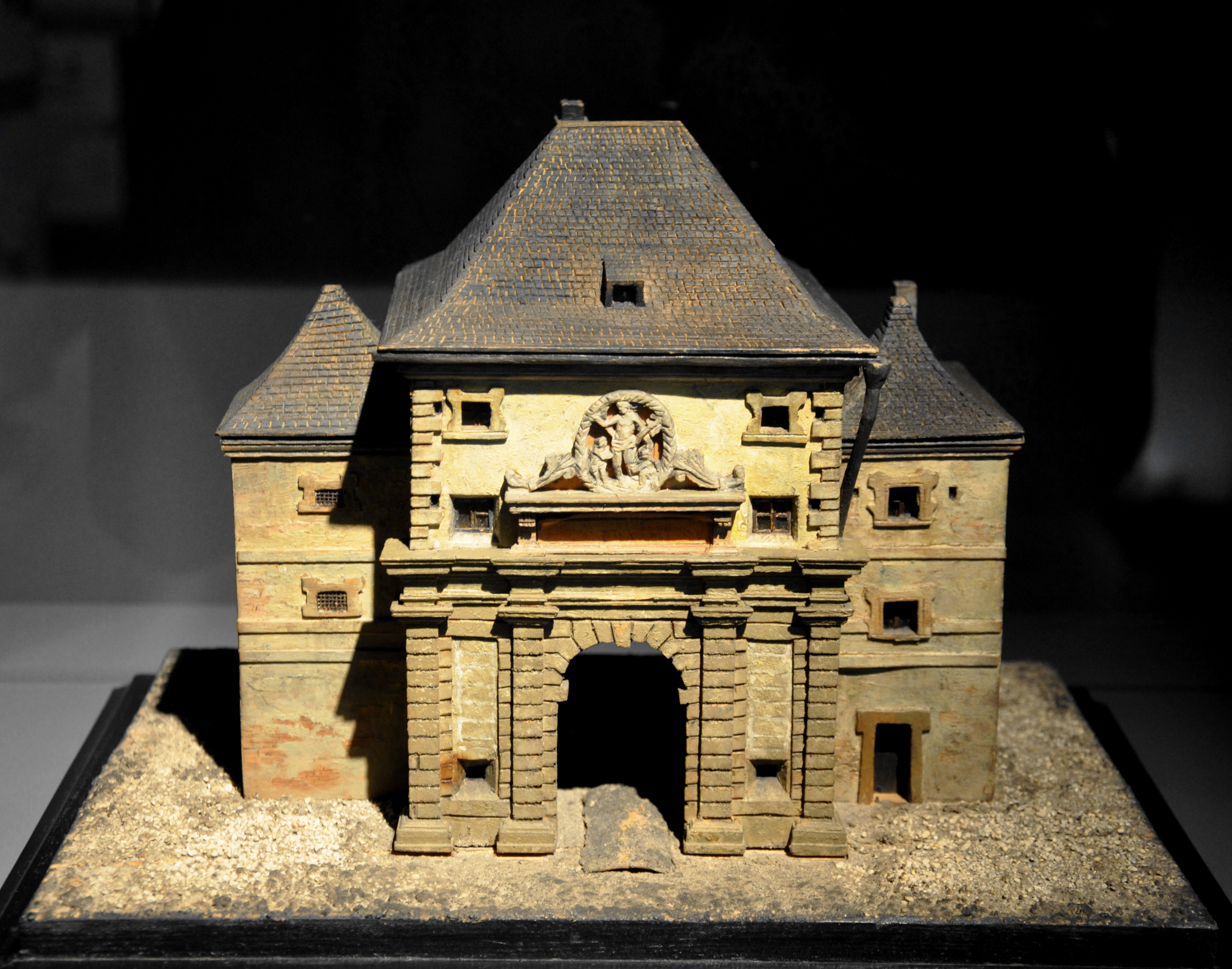
Model of 1895 the Linzer Tor in Salzburg Museum

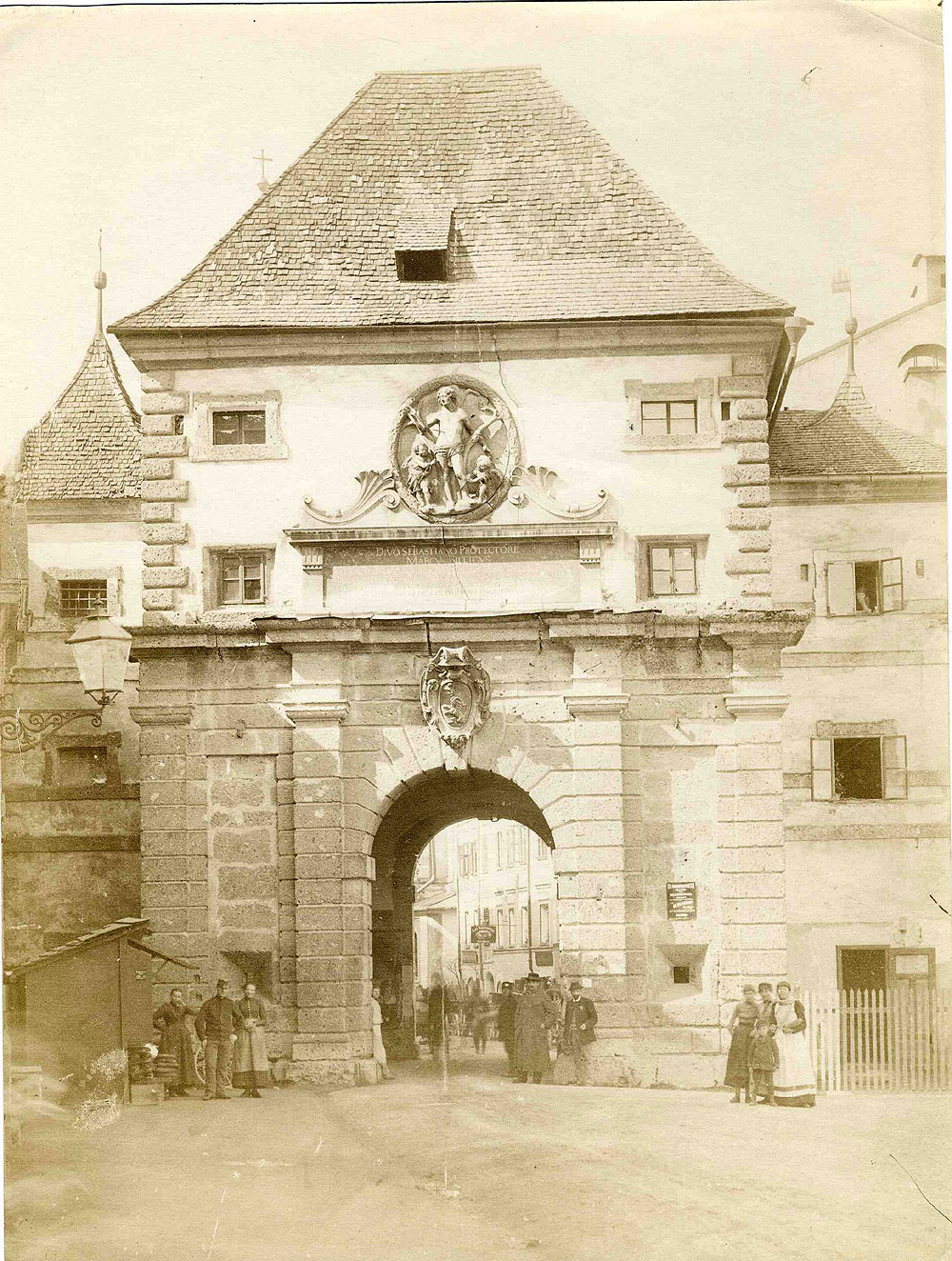
Karl Hintner Salzburg Linzer Tor

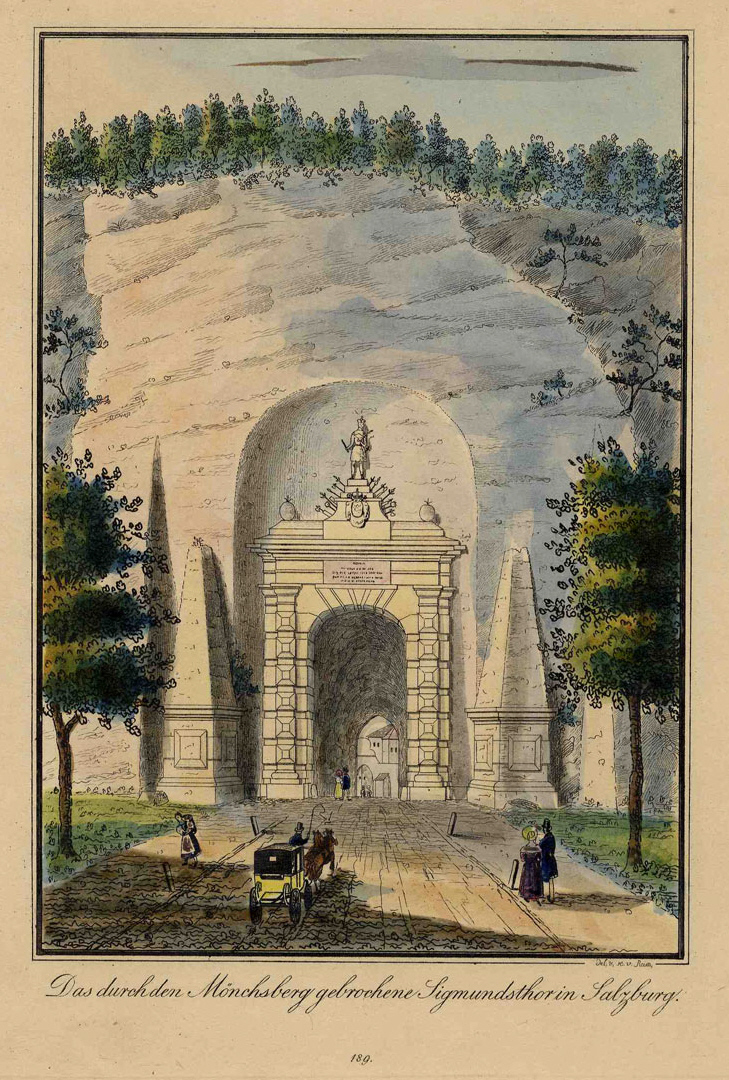
Salzburg Sigmundsthor

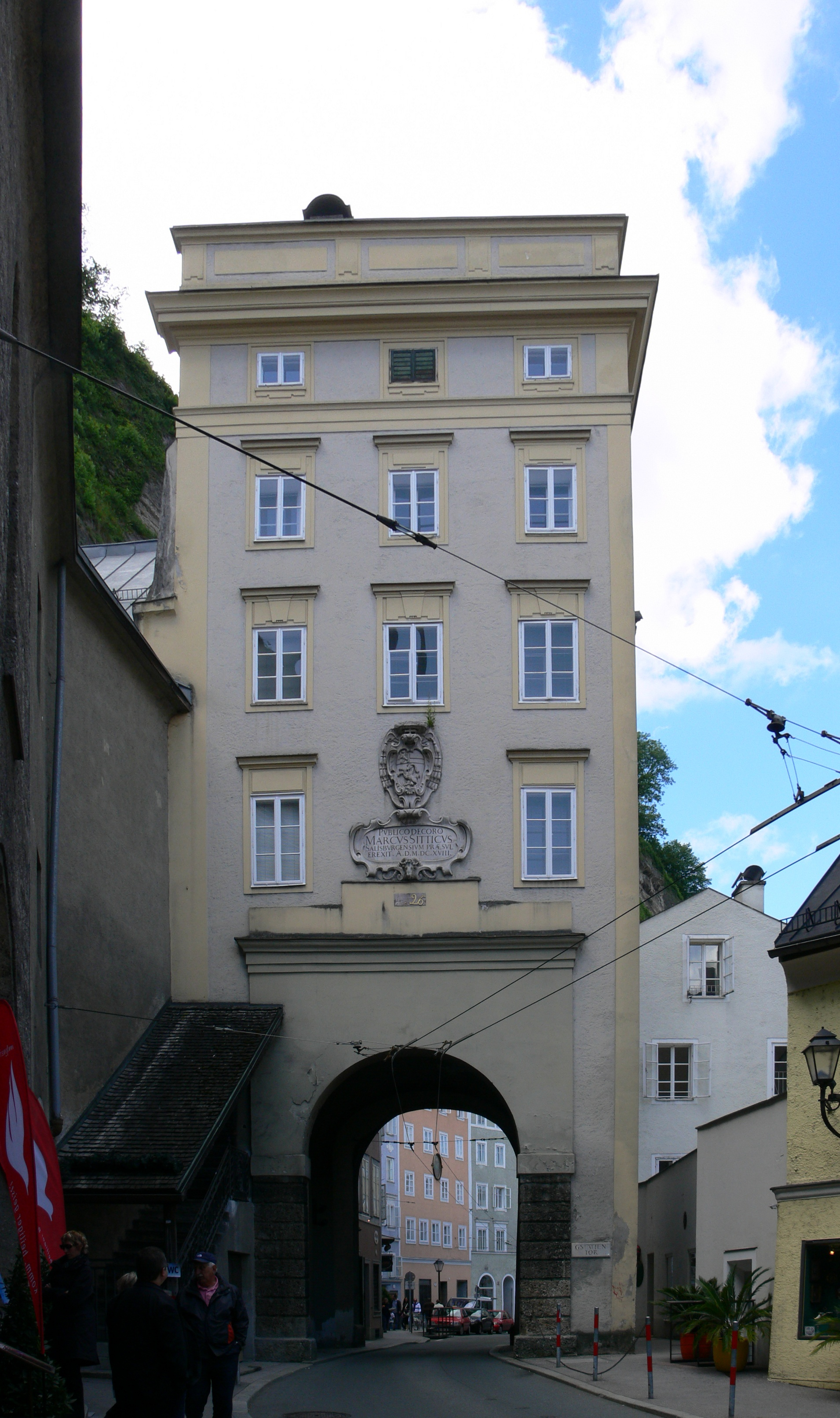
Salzburg Gstättentor Innenseite

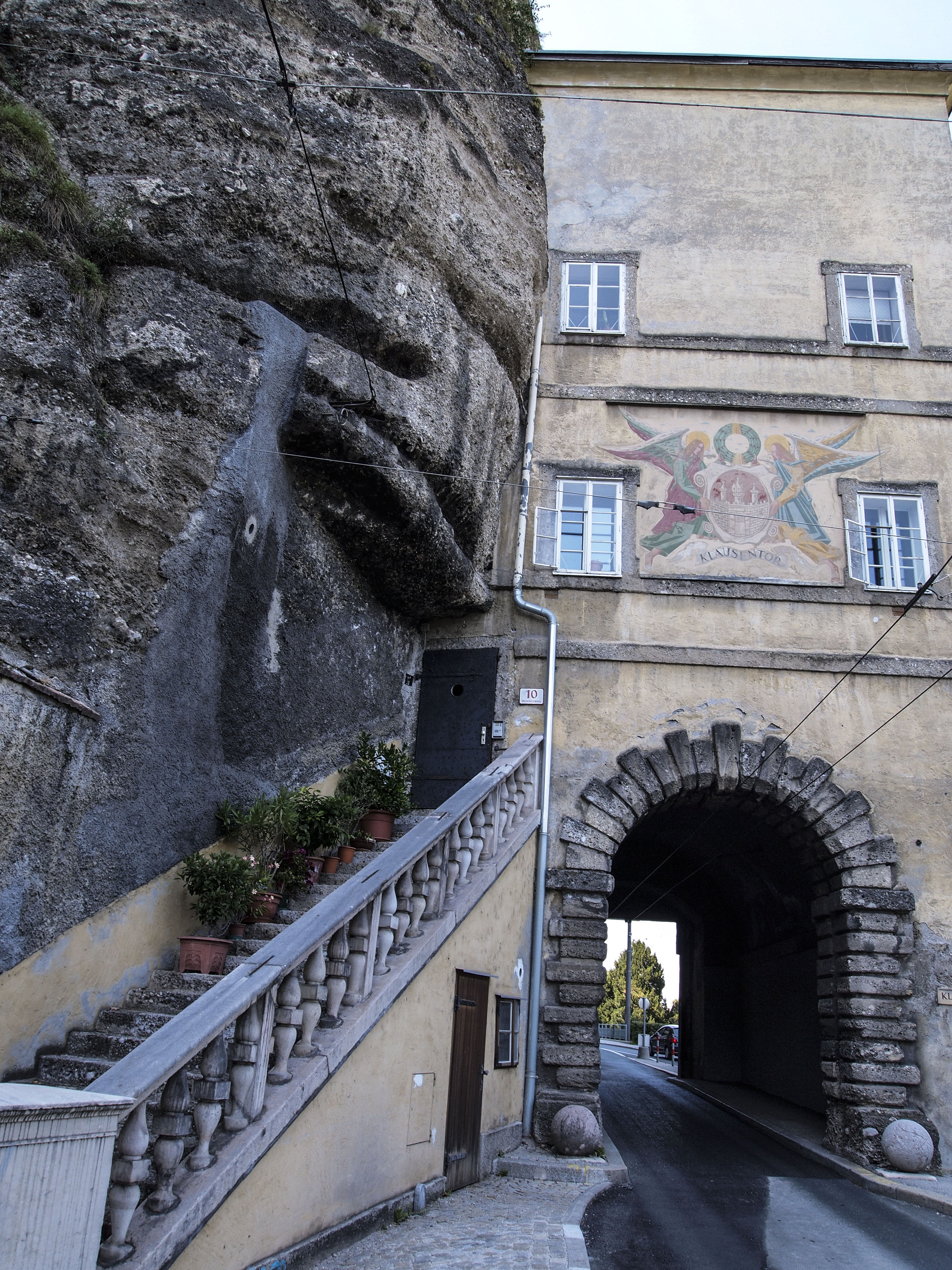
Klausentor, Salzburg

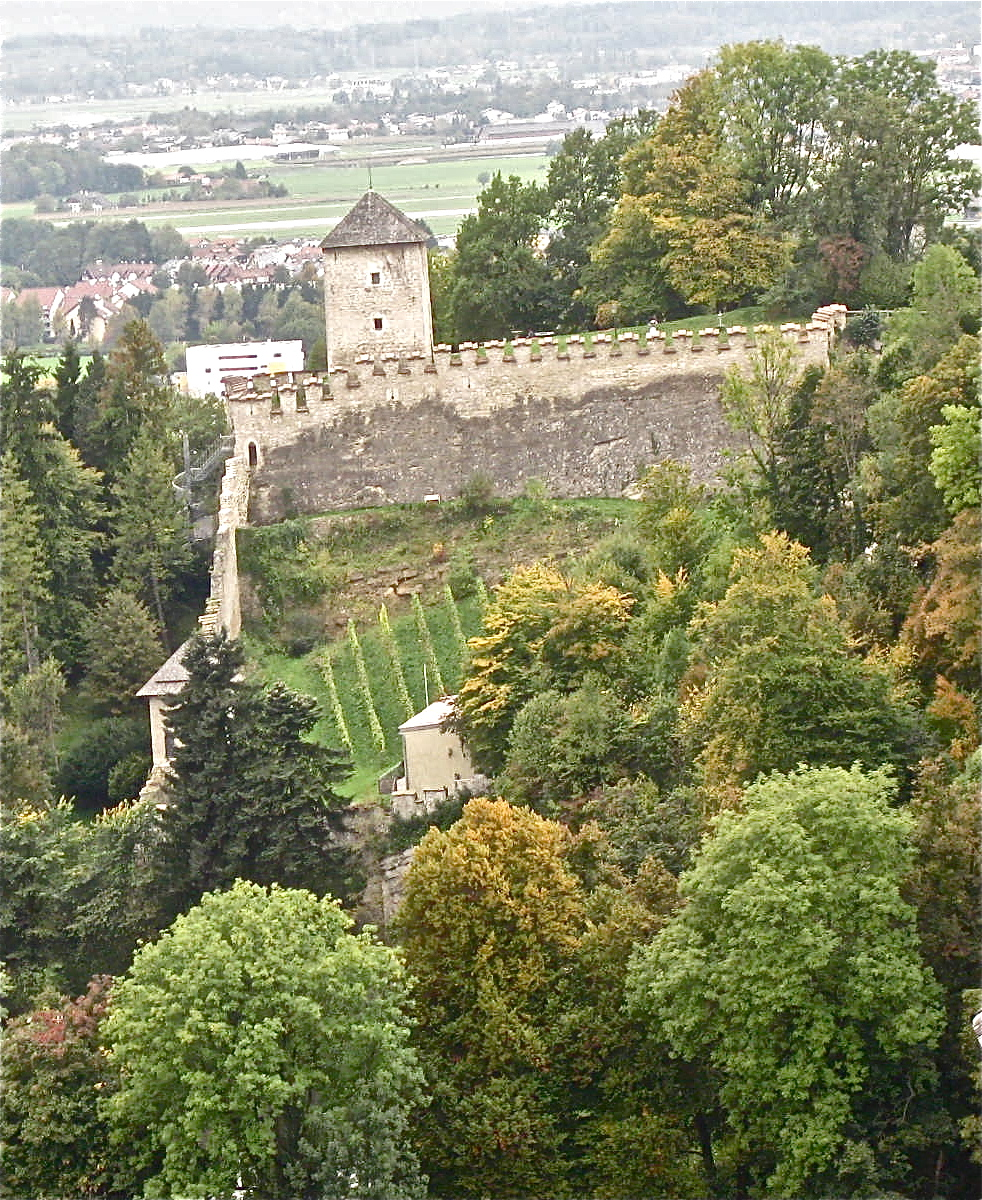
Salzburg city wall - west of the Castle.

=== Styria (Steiermark) ===
- Bruck an der Mur. At the confluence of the Mur and the Murz rivers, An almost rectangular town founded by King Ottokar II in 1263, when it was referred to as ‘Novella Plantatio’. The town has a grid plan and a large rectangular marketplace. The older 'Ruine Landskron' is at the northeast corner. Walls survive on the north side and along the river. There are two round towers on the north wall but the former gates - Leobnertor, Grazertor and Wienertor have disappeared.
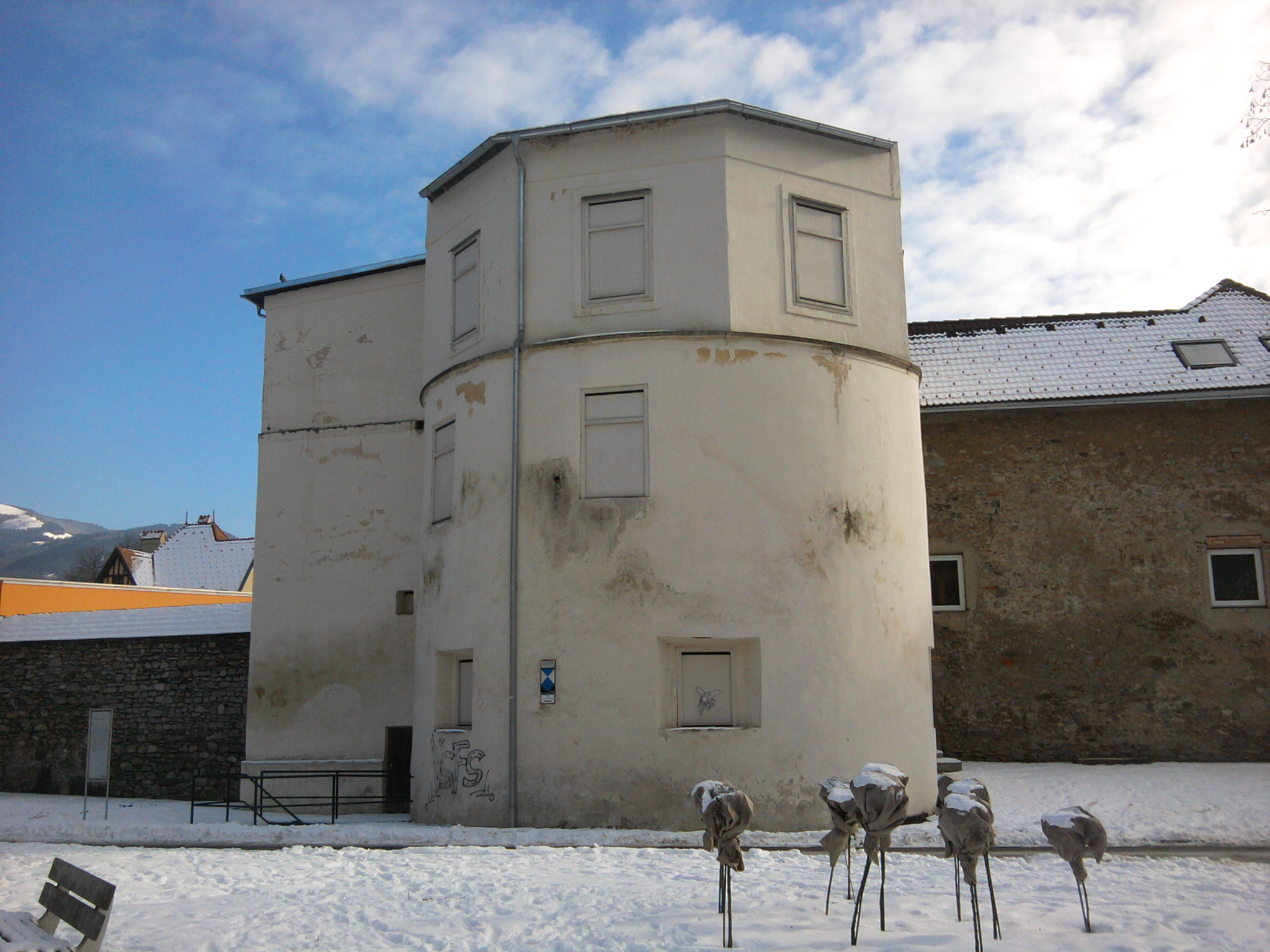
Reckturm, Bruck an der Mur, Austria

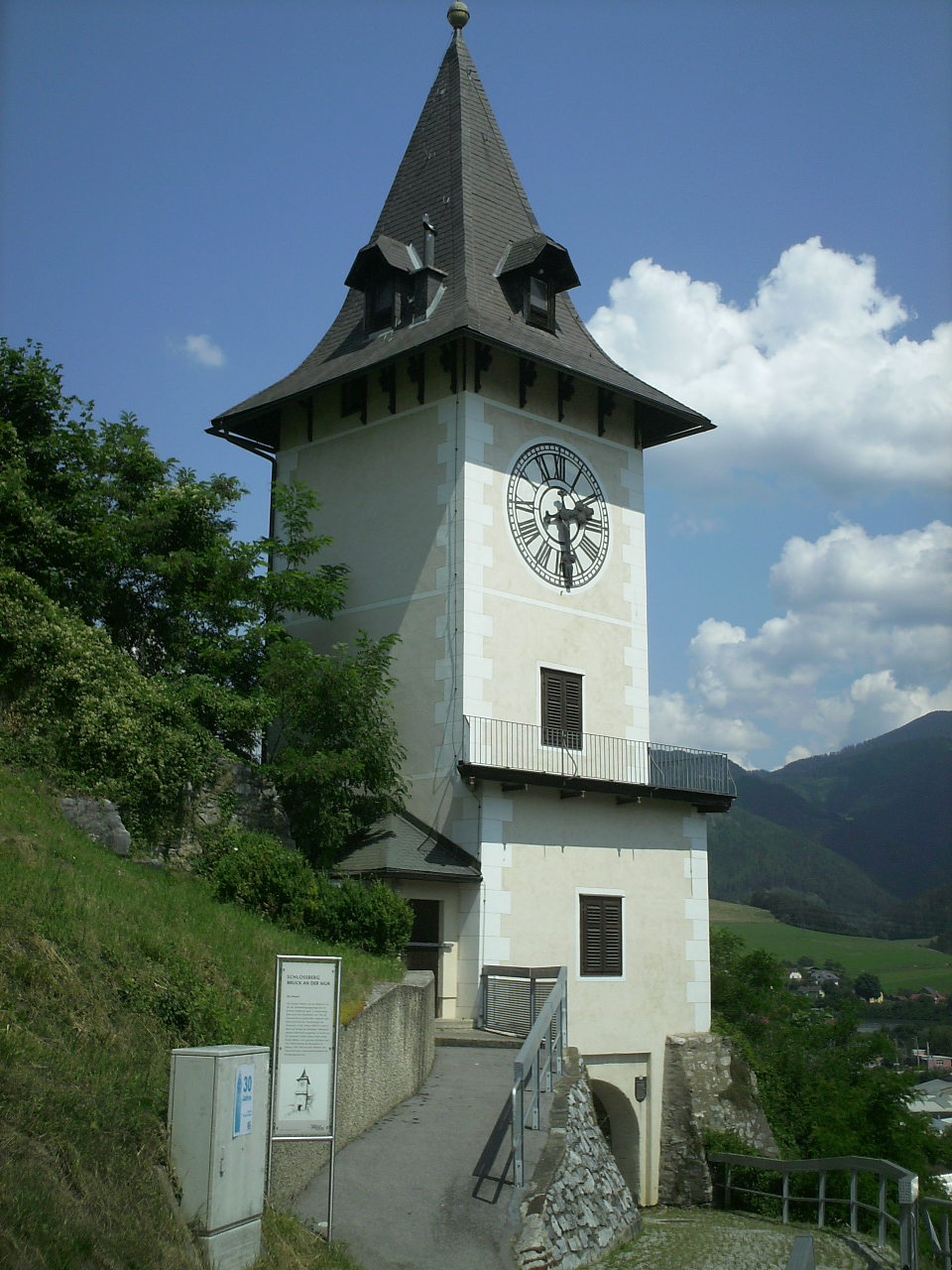
Uhrturm Schloßberg Bruck-Mur

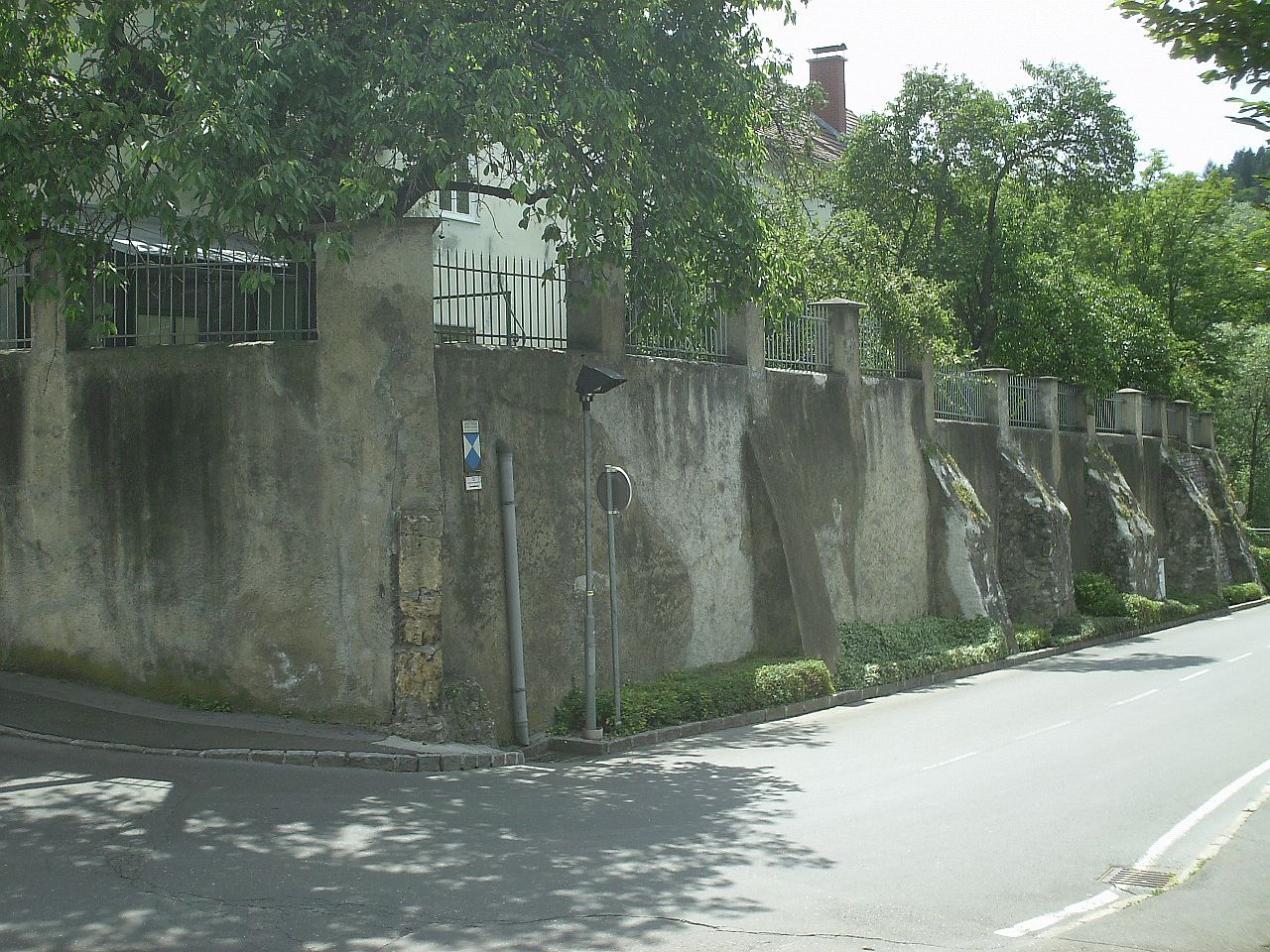
Stadtmauer Schiffertor Bruck

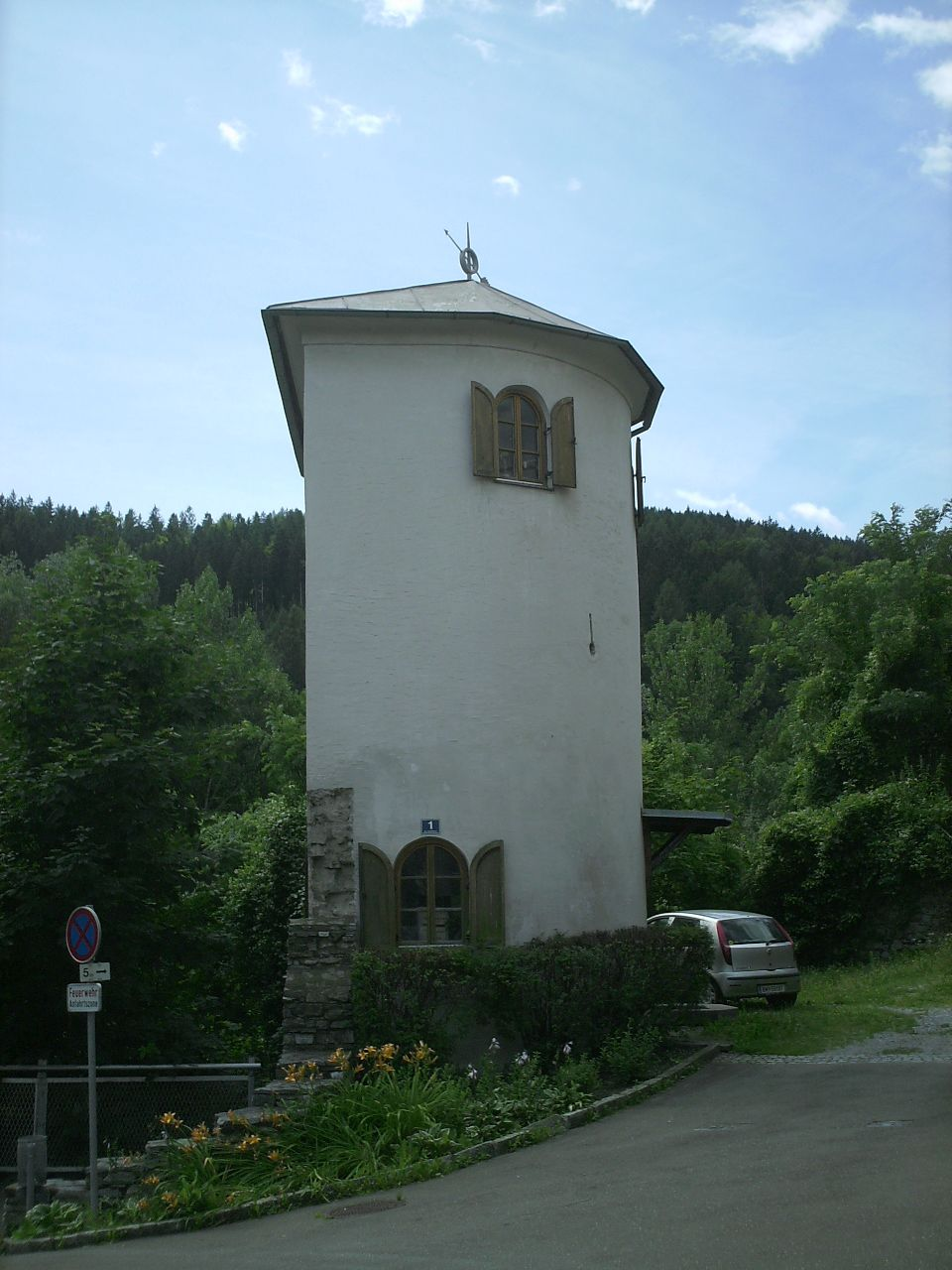
Schifferturm, Bruck an der Mur

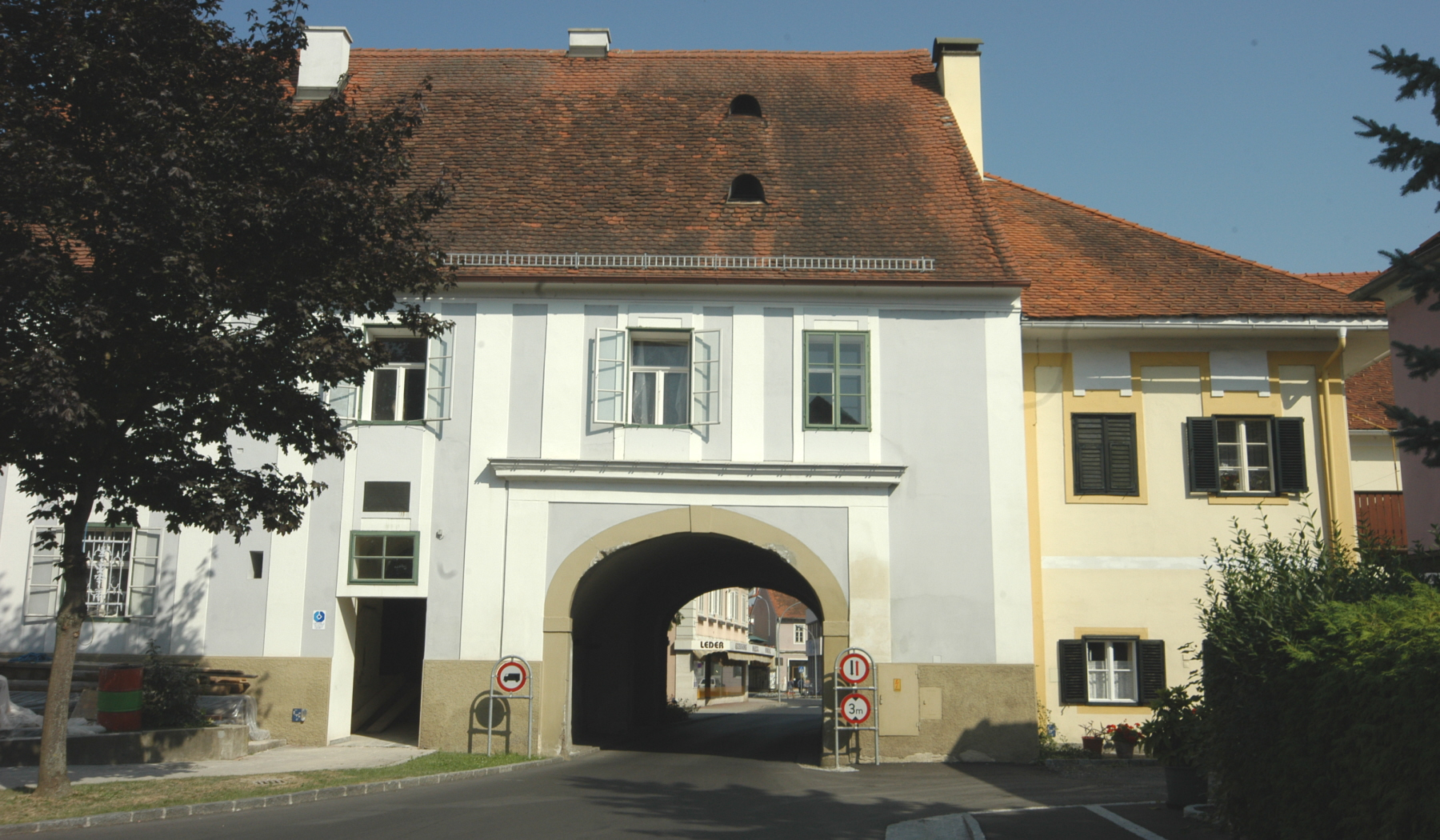
Feldback Grazer

- Feldbach. At Felbach the ‘Tabor’ was a rectangular group of fortified houses, built around Felbach parish church in the early 16th century. These successfully resisted attack by the Haiduks – Hungarian Peasant bandits. Leading from the southwest corner of the Market Place is the surviving Grazer Tor–a gateway through a house. The surviving houses of the ‘Tabor’ are preserved as a museum complex.
- Friedberg. On the boundary between Lower Austria, Styria and the historic borderland with Hungary. Described in Dehio as a ‘Städtchen’, the town and castle were laidout after 1170 for the protection of the ‘Wechel Strasse’ or Trade Road between Wiener Neustadt and Gleisdorf. Part of the costs of the defences were met in 1194 from the ransom paid for Richard the Lionheart. Today the defences and castle have disappeared, but GIS and property boundaries suggest the position of the walled enclosure.
- Furstenfeld is close to the historic boundary between the Duchy of Styria and Hungary. Its strategic position is emphasised by its re-fortification in the mid 16th century against the Turks. While the town is a long rectangular shape, property boundaries and vertical air photography shows that it consists of two distinct parts or towns. The southeast part has a curved street plan, a Y-shaped marketplace, into which a Church, founded around 1200 by the Knights of St John was fitted, and the Pheilburg Castle. The town was established about 1170 by Ottokar IV, Duke of Styria. Between 1215 and 1220 the Babenberg Leopold VI probably laid out an almost square town with a grid street plan that is attached to the other town. The second town is very similar to the square frontier towns of Lower Austria, but is different inasmuch as it has an H street plan of the type seen in other Styrian towns. This plan consists of two main parallel streets that are joined across by wide marketplace, forming the bar to the H. In 1232 Furstenfeld received both Market rights and a charter. The widespread reconstruction of the defences in the mid 16th century by the Italian military architect Domenico dell’Allio (1505–1563) has meant that much of the evidence for the medieval walls has disappeared. There are remains of four large angular bastions at the corners of the town. The re-construction of the fortress was finished in 1581.
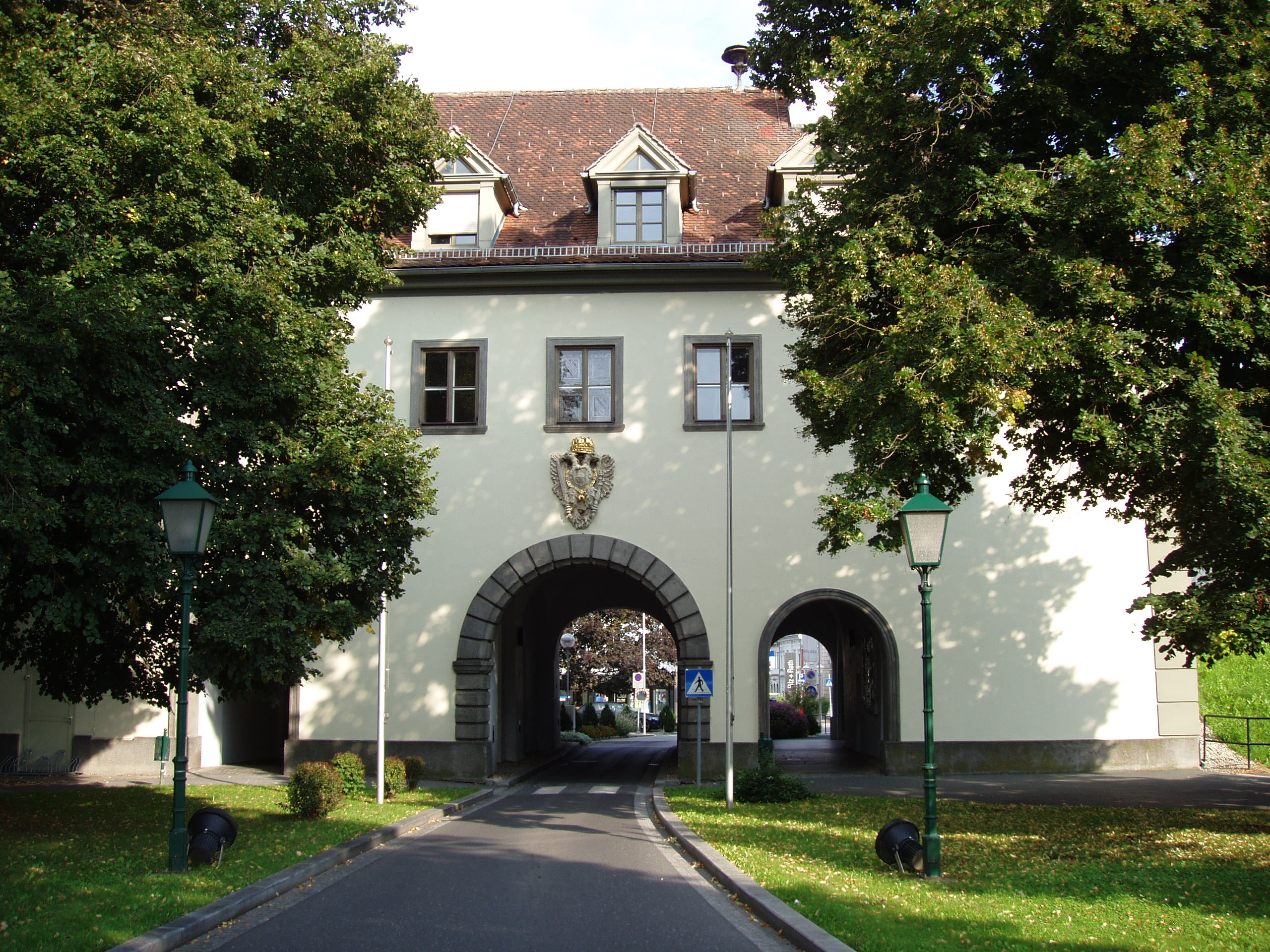
Grazertor fuerstenfeld

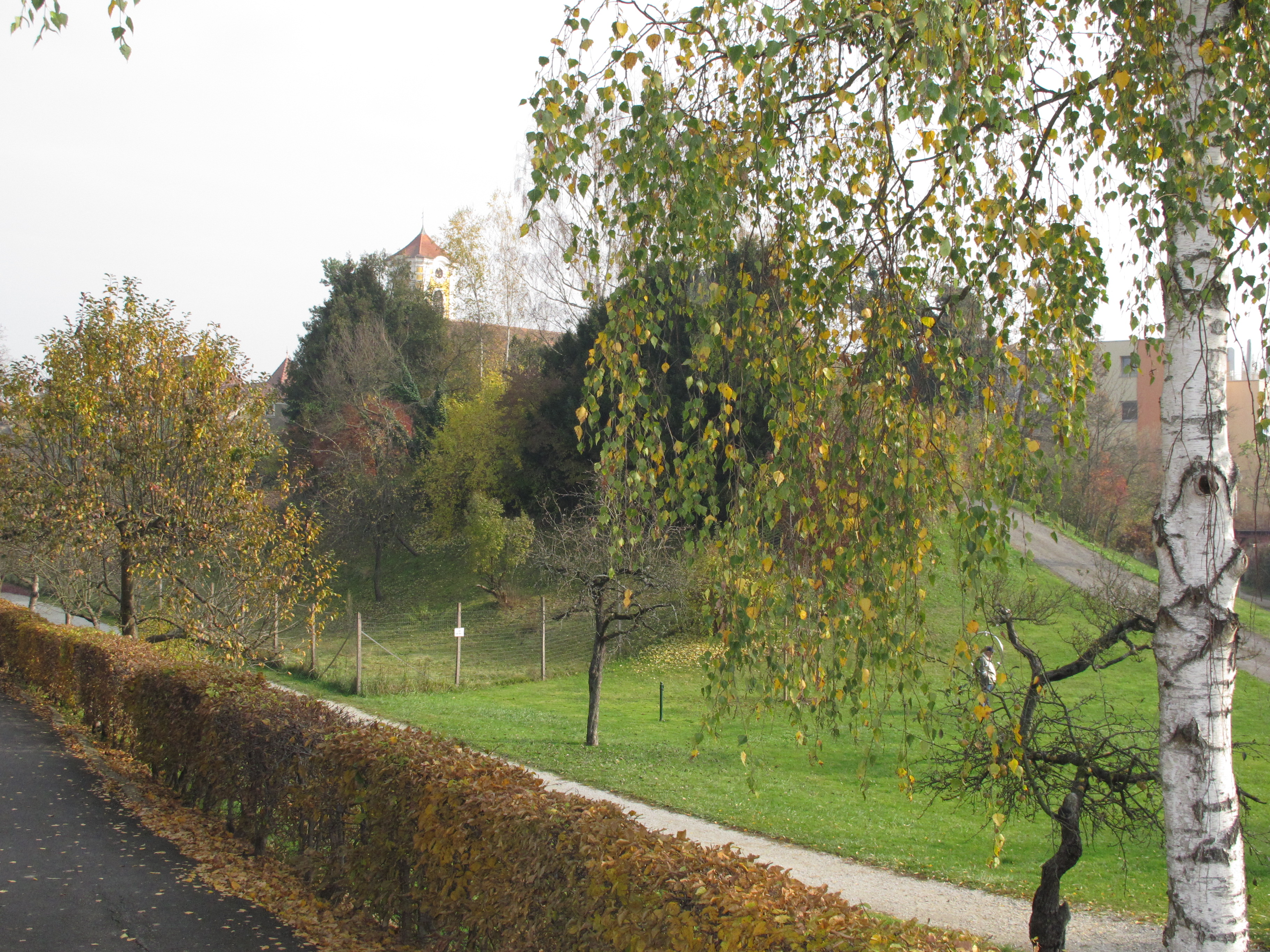
Fuerstenfeld klosterbastei

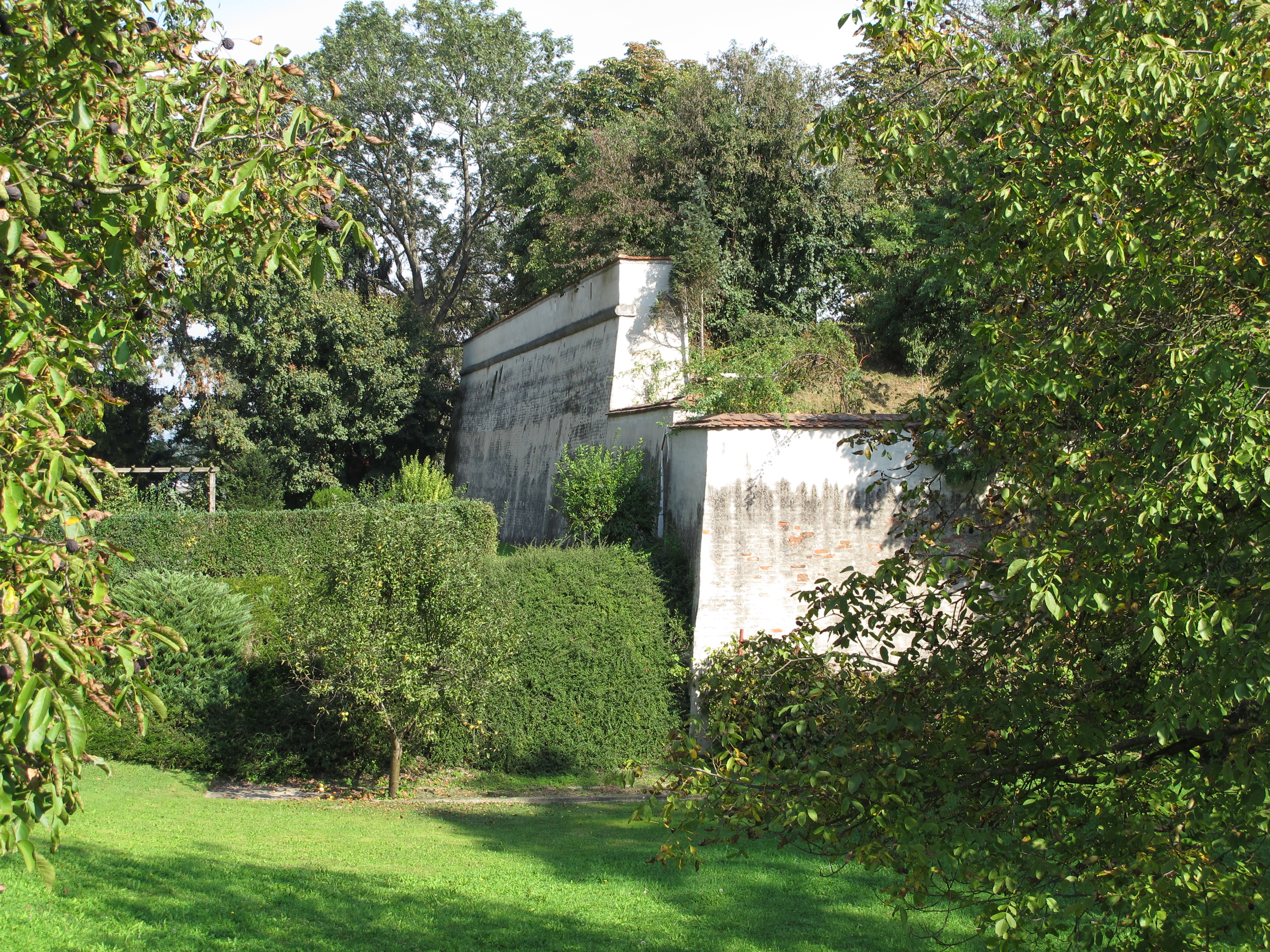
Muehlbastei fuerstenfeld

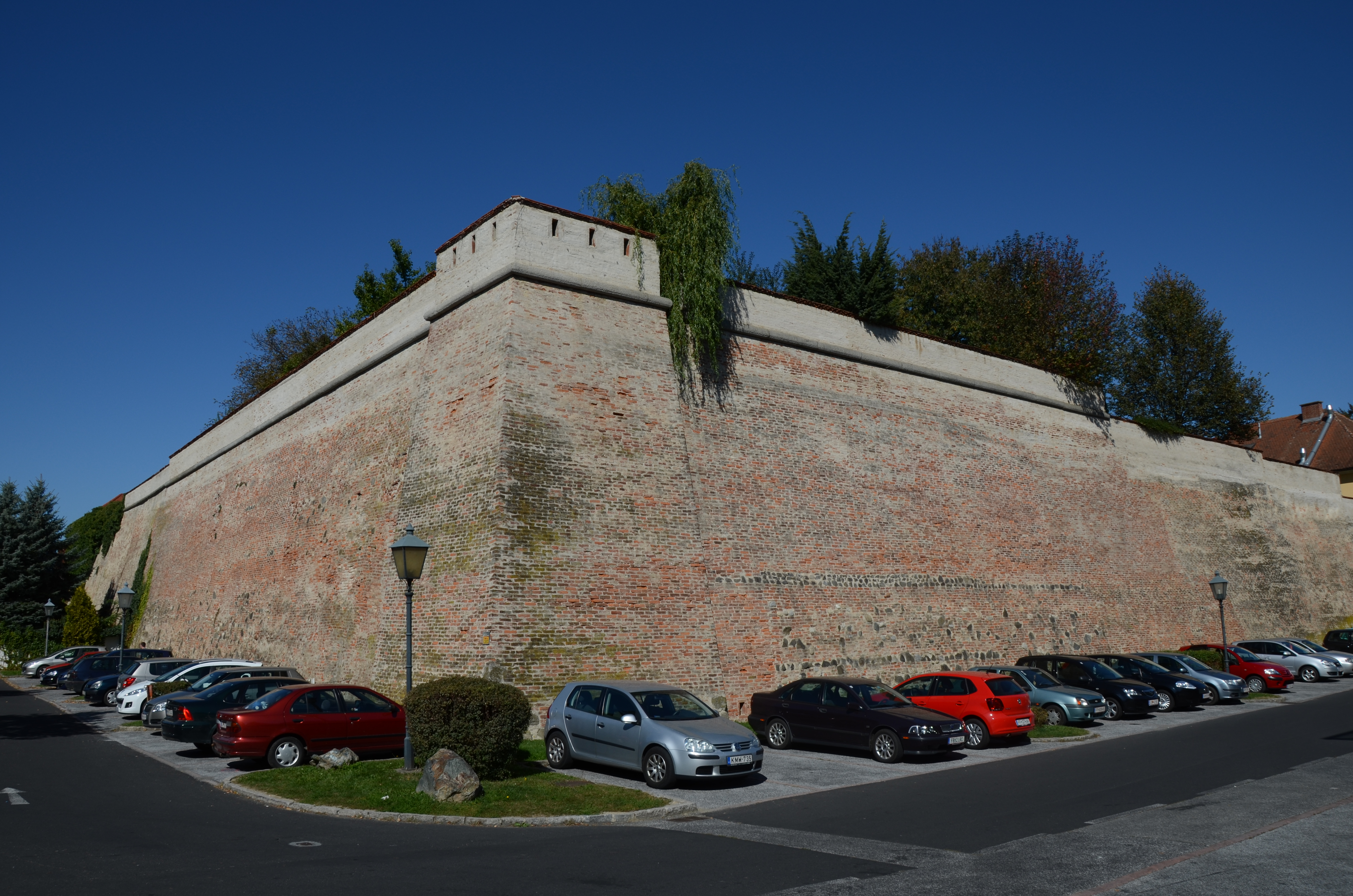
Ungarbastei fuerstenfeld
- Graz. The name Graz implies an early Slavic settlement and the street plan hints at a possible ovoid enclosure -Sackstrasse on west and the curved Wickenburggasse-Glacisstrasse on the northeast – with the Schlossberg in the northwest as citadel which have dominated an early settlement. However the earlier walled town first mentioned in 1115, was to the south and west of this and fronted onto the river Mur. Starting in 1544 the refortification of Graz by of the Italian military architect Domenico dell'Allio has done much to disguise the medieval defences. Merian’s print of Graz from the south in 1679 shows Graz protected by 10 massive angled bastions with a water-filled moat in front of them. In this print some of the medieval gate towers can be recognised and the Eisen Tor and the southern medieval wall would have coincided with the curtain wall of dell’Allio’s defences. Also to the north of the Y-shaped or ‘Driecksform’ marketplace there were three gates on the Sackgasse, and the Bruchentor and Murtor, demolished 1837, were on and adjacent to the bridge across the Mur. Today the only gates remaining are the Burgtor adjacent to the Schlossberg, and the Aussere Paulustor on the E, which formed part of the later defences.
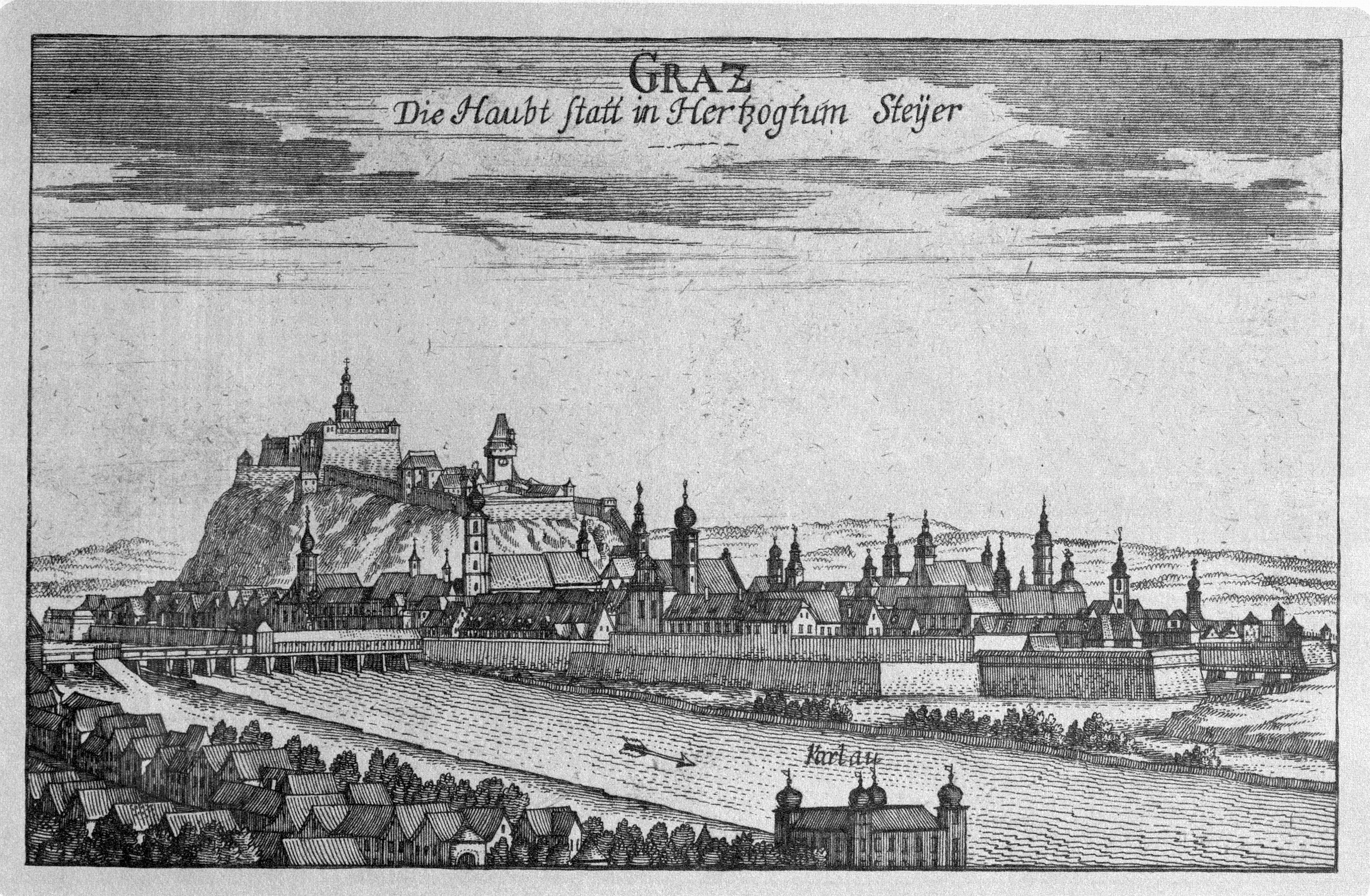
Vischer - Graz in Topographia Ducatus Stiria

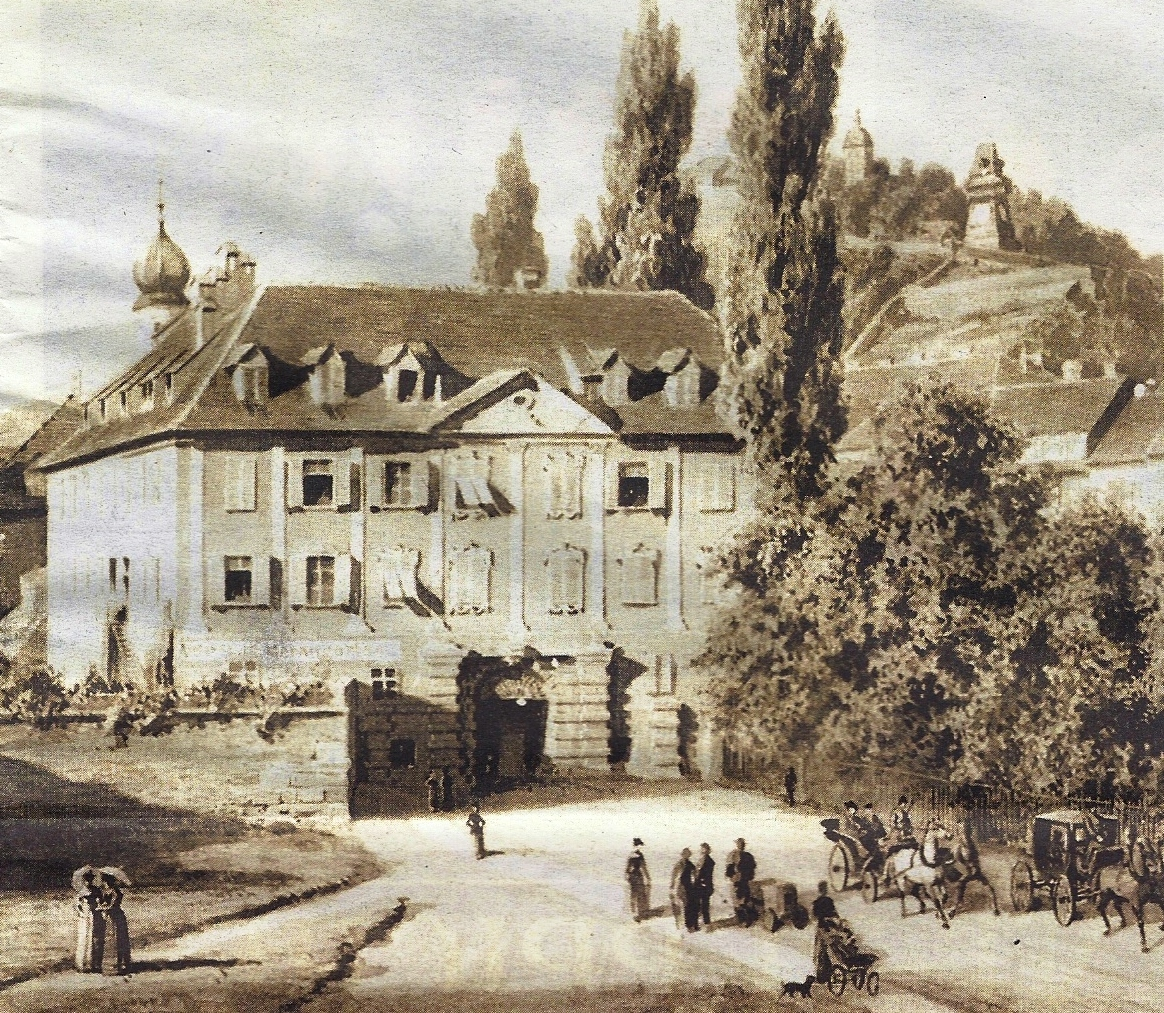
Graz. The Neutor in 1883-Neutorgasse

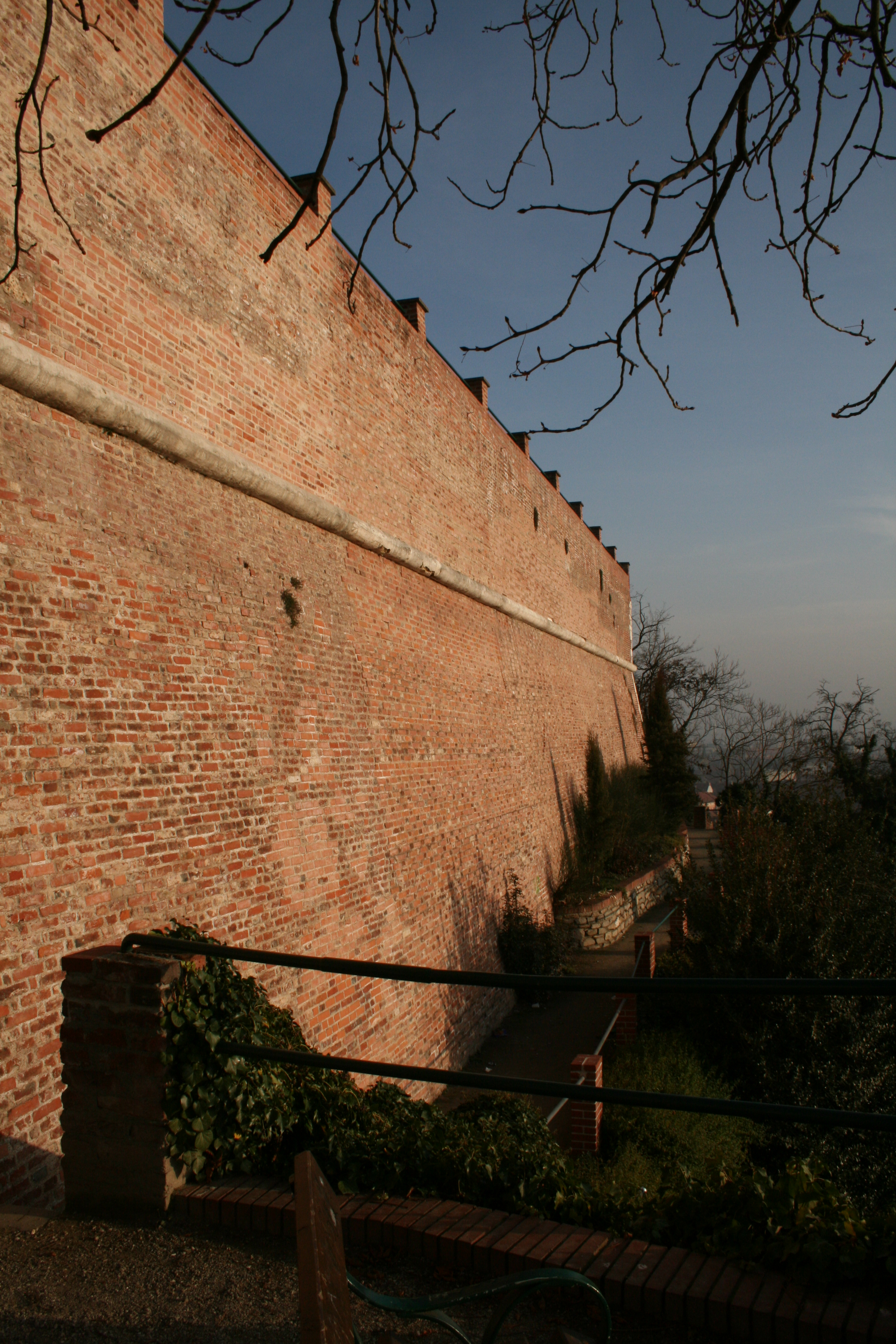
Graz. Bastion at the Schlossberg

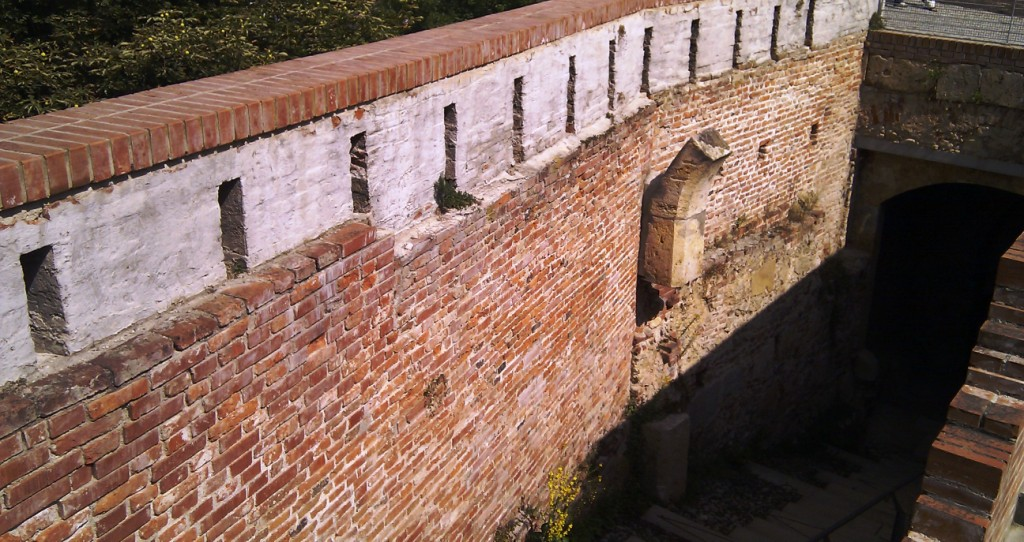
Grazer Schloßberg. The Glöckl Battery

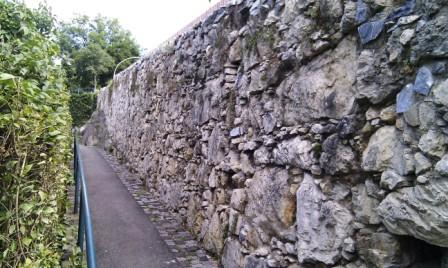
Grazer Schloßberg The Katzewall

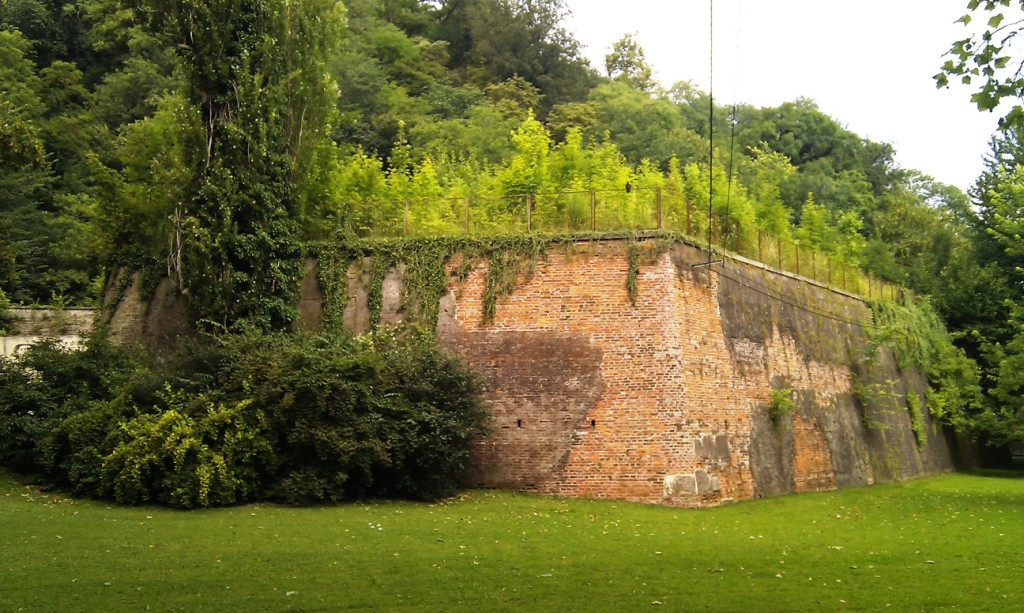
Grazer Schloßberg Paulustor bastion

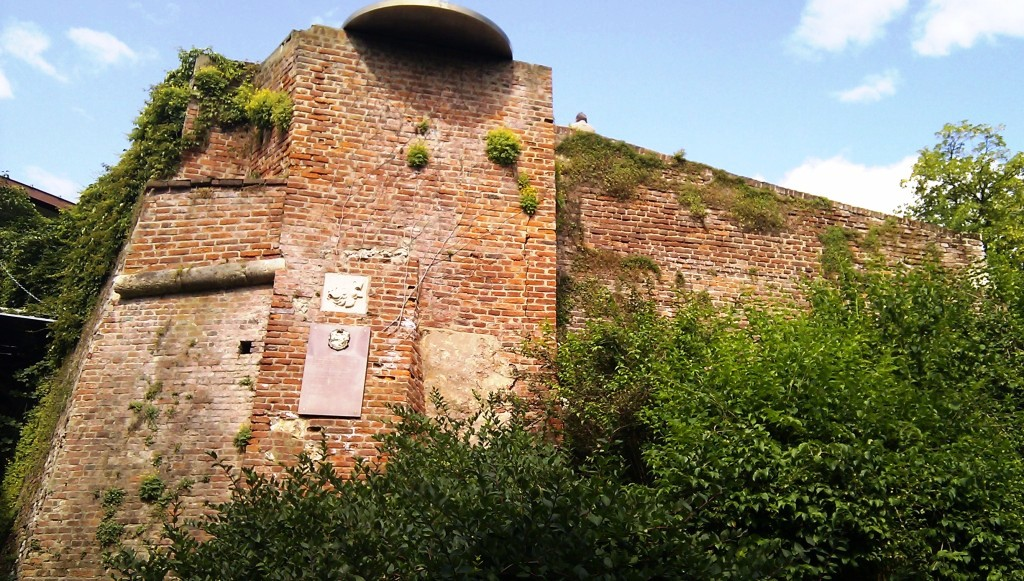
Grazer Schloßberg: outer zwinger

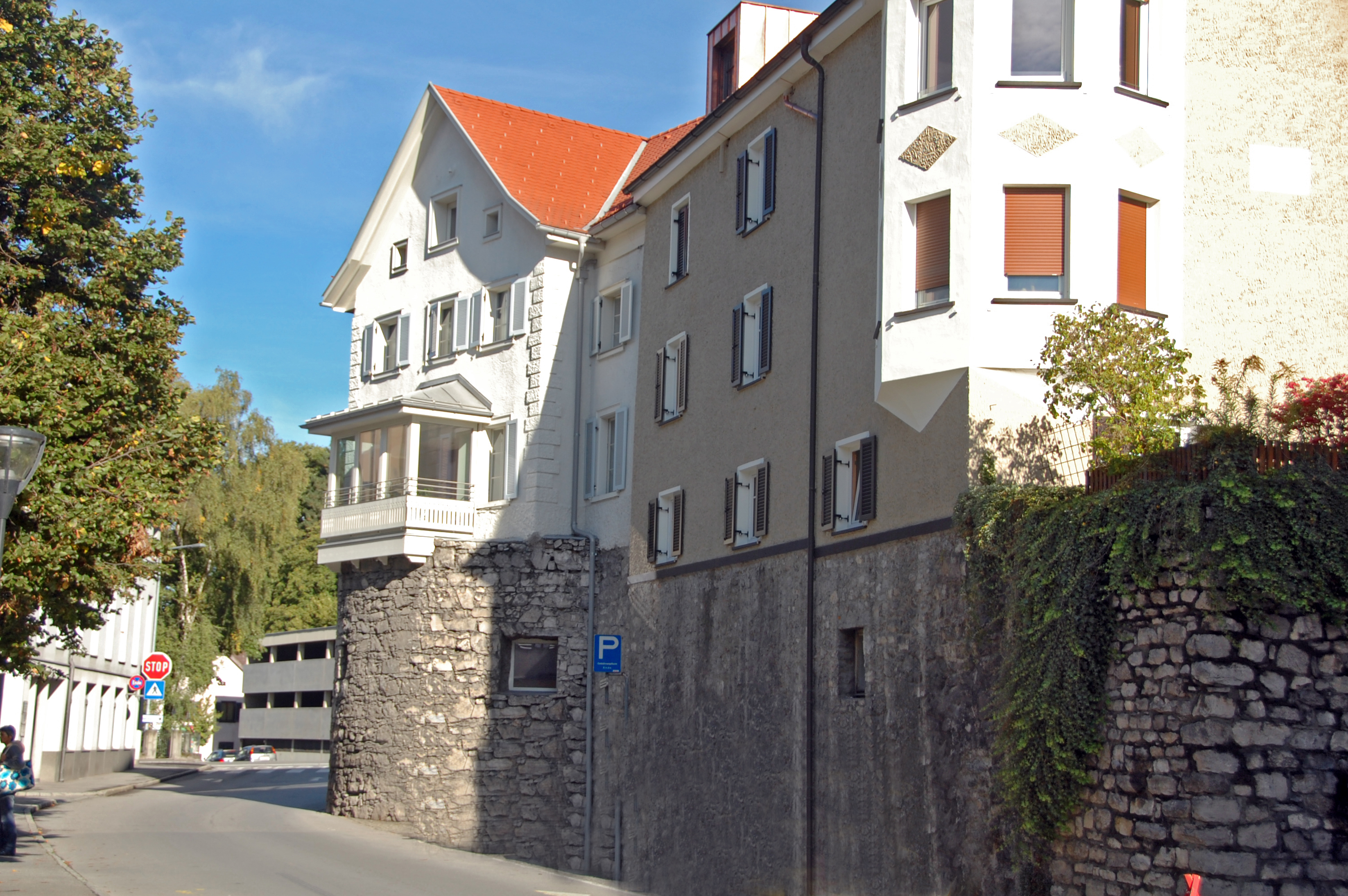
Stadtmauer, Pulverturmstraße
- Hartberg is situated near the historic border between Austria and Hungary, Hartberg was laid out by the Margrave Leopold I ‘The Strong’ of Styria between 1125 and 1128. First mentioned as a town ‘Stadt’ in 1286. Today parts of the walls and two towers, the Reckturm and Schölbingerturm remain.
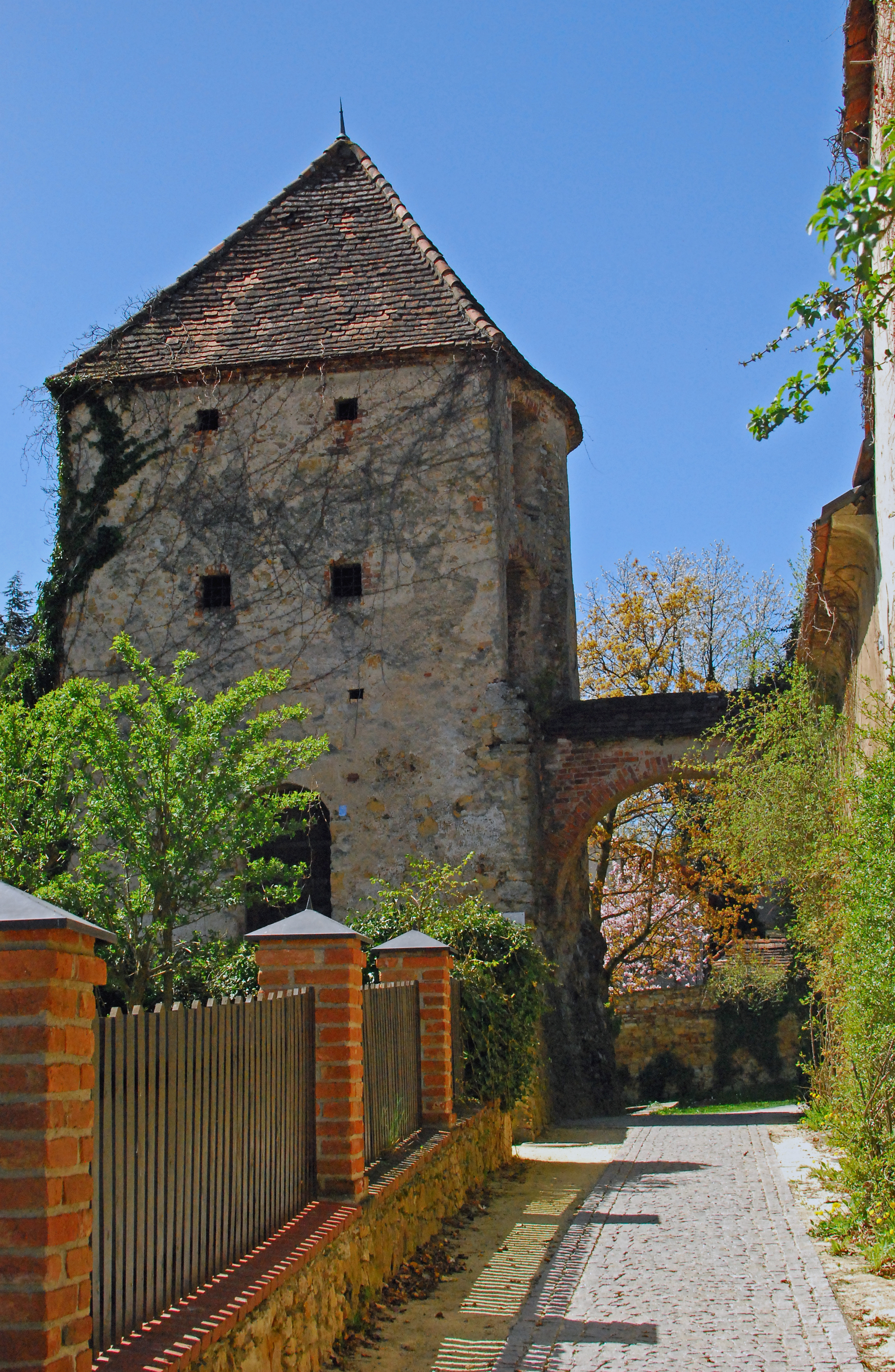
Reckturm Hartberg

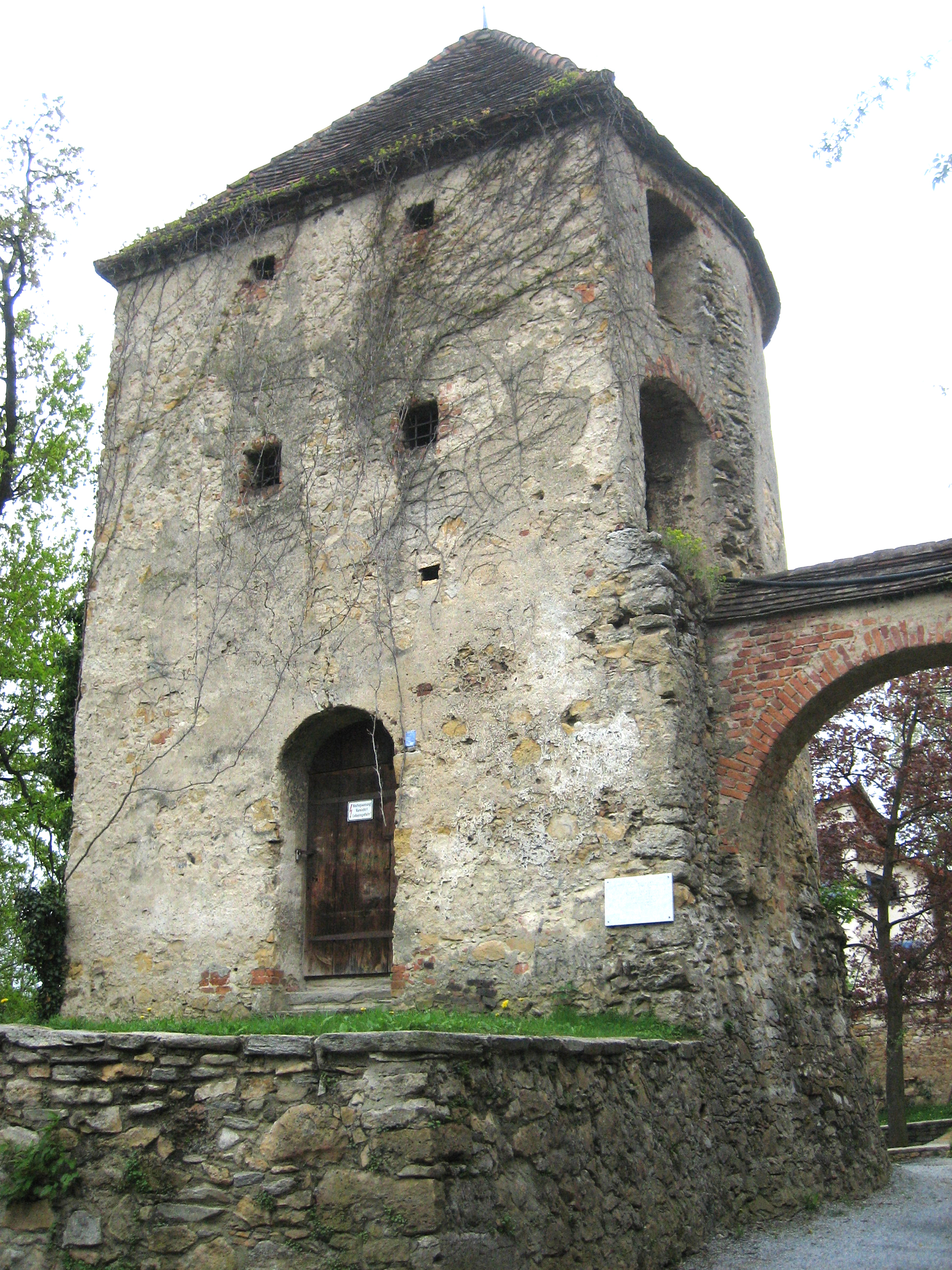
Reckturm

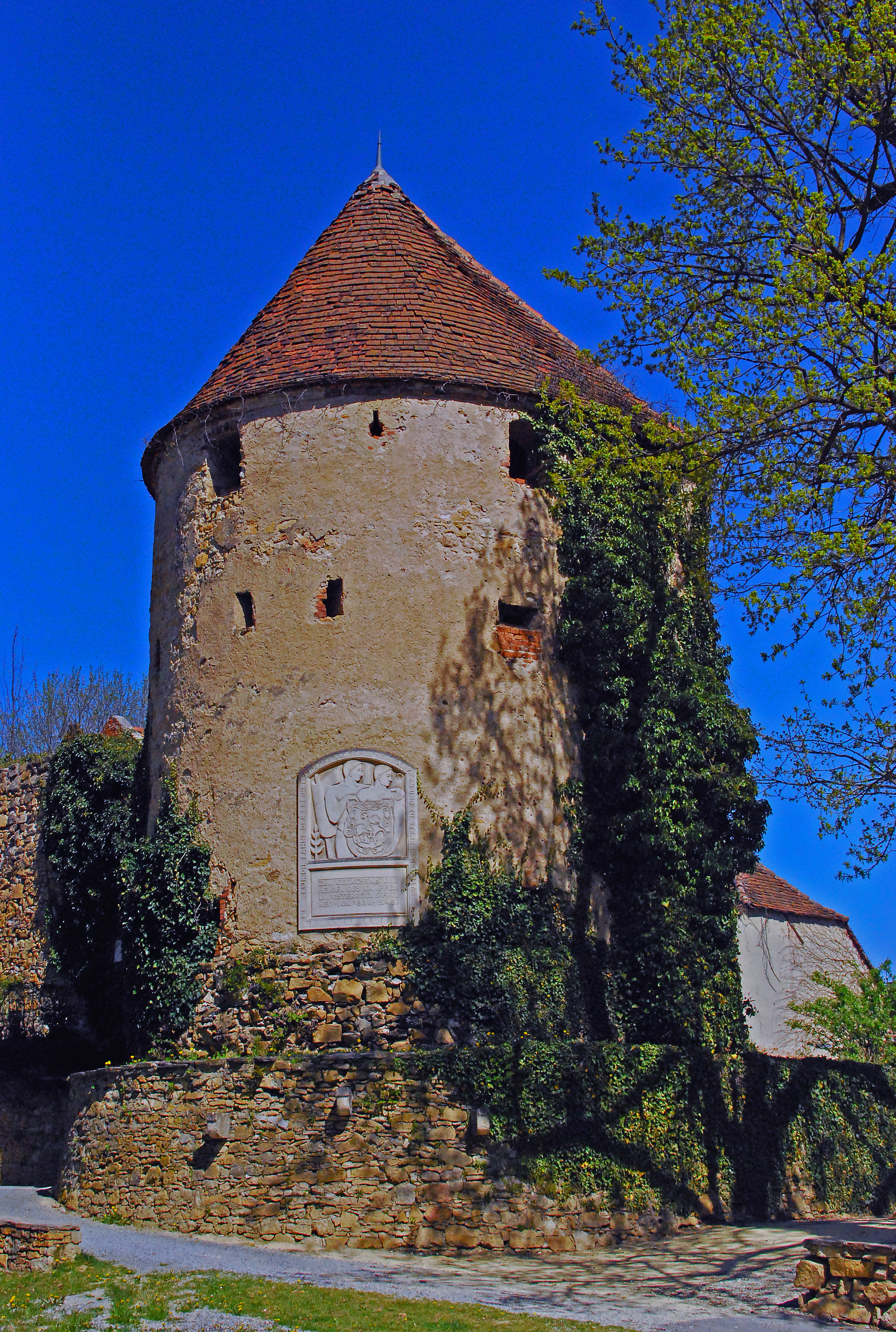
Stadtmauer Hartberg

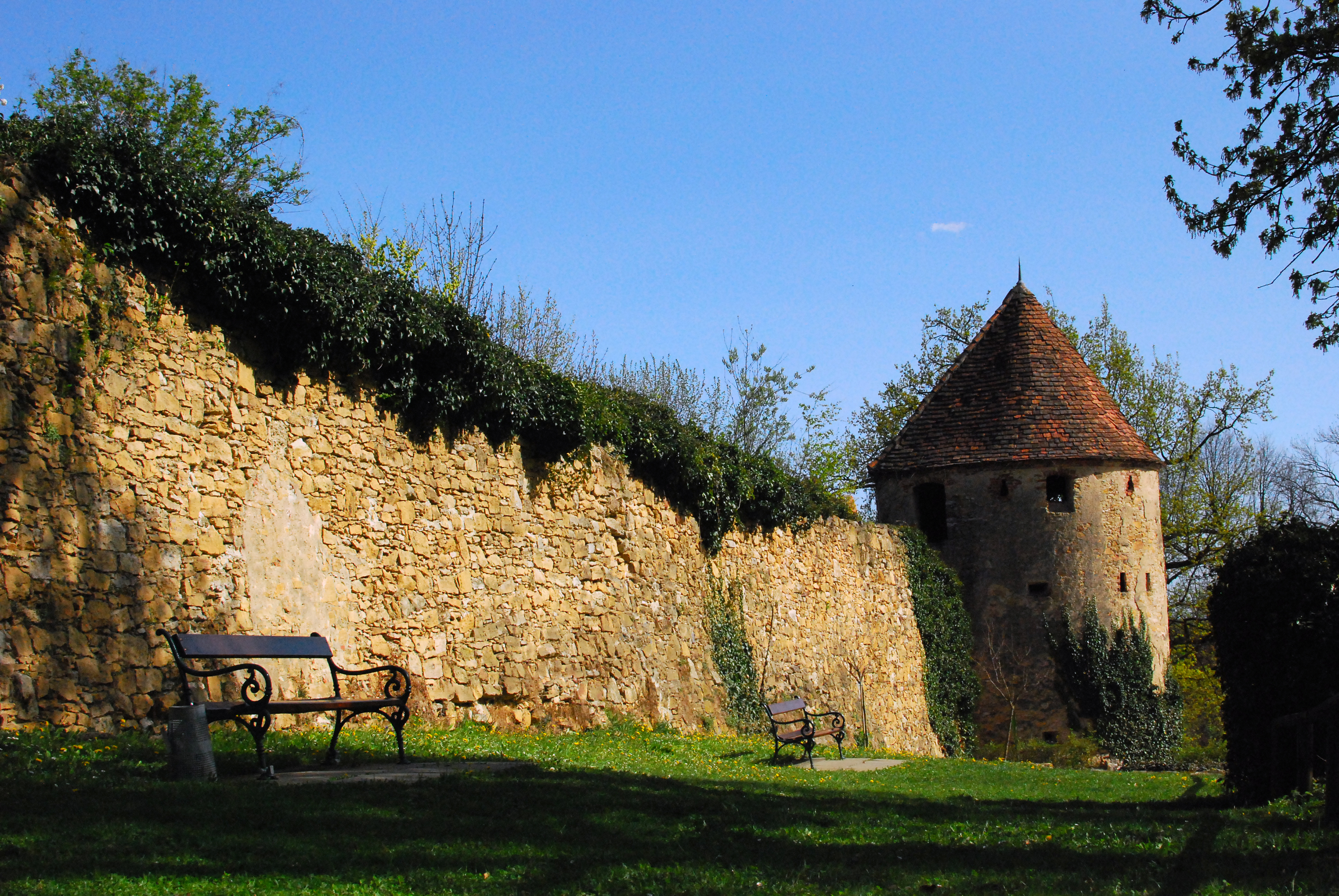
Alte Stadtmauer Hartberg
- Judenburg is sited on a promontory between the river Mur and the Purbach stream, Judenburg was founded as a trading settlement in 1075. Granted a charter in 1224, the walls, first mentioned in 1259, largely survive with a number of towers. The seven gates to the town have been demolished. A moat and secondary wall were added to the defences on the west and SW. The town has the typical H plan layout of many Styrian towns with two roughly parallel main streets joined to each other by the marketplace.
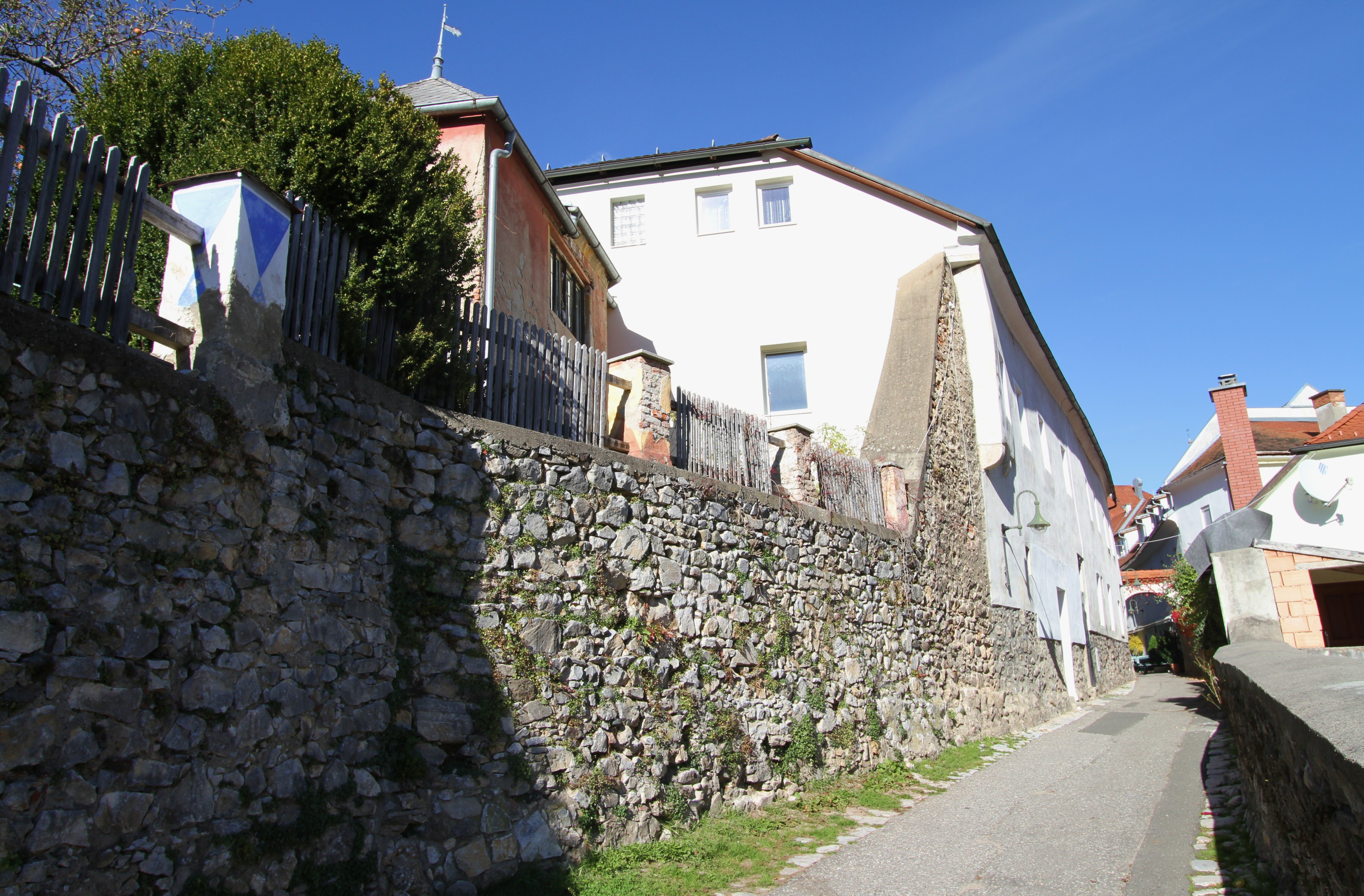
Judenburg Wohnhaus Stadtmauer Weyergasse

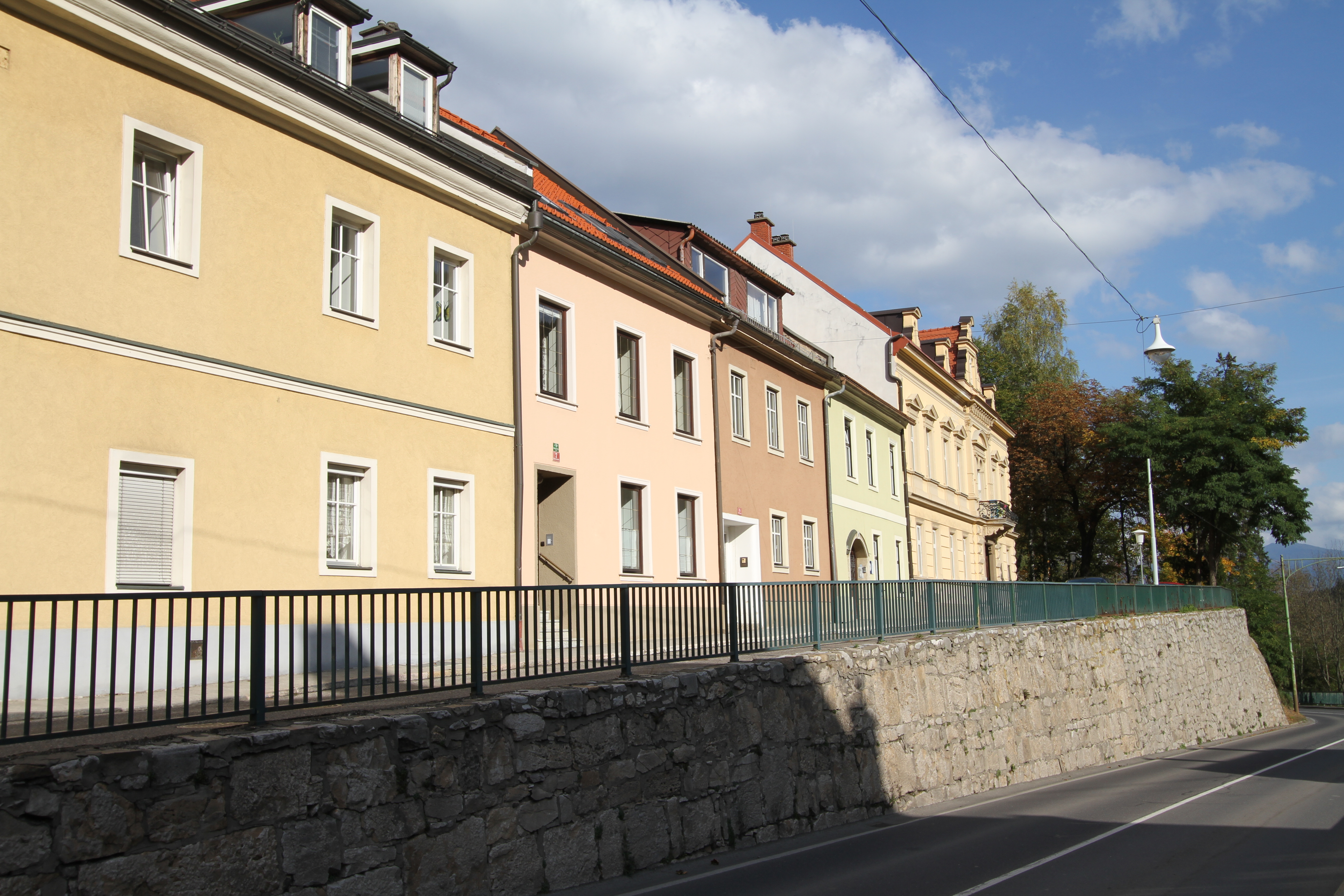
Judenburg Ederbastei Stadtmauer

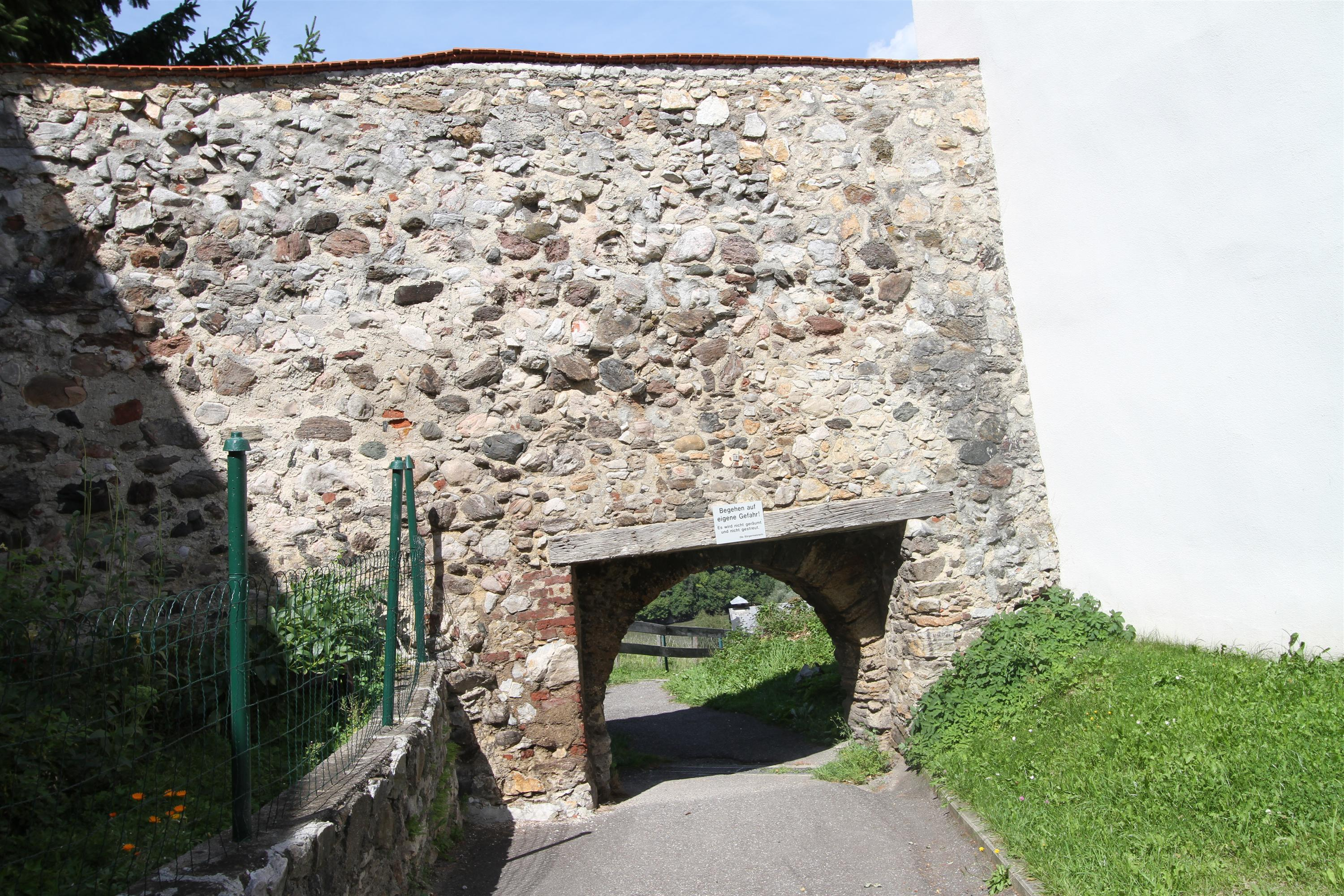
Sautörl Judenburg
- Knittelfeld was probably founded in its present position by King Ottokar II around 1265. In 1302 Duke Rudolf II granted Knittelfeld a charter with ‘all the rights currently enjoyed by Judenburg’. A 17th-century print shows Knittelfeld from the south as a walled town, with three round bastions, two corner towers and a west gate-tower. Little remains of the walls, which were bounded by a stream on the NE. Traces of the wall skirt round the parish church on the SW. One corner tower has partly survived. There is a rectangular marketplace running N-S
- Leoben was transferred to its present site on a bend in the river Mur, in 1262, by King Ottokar II. The layout of the town was almost a square, cutting across the ‘neck’ of an elongated bend in the river. On both the east and west sides of the town were bridges across the Mur. There were round or rectangular corner towers and four or five gate-towers. The gate-tower on the west -‘Mautturm’ or ‘Schwammerlturm’ still stands in a rebuilt form. The town is laid out on a grid plan with a long rectangular marketplace. On the south side, the ‘Alle Glacis’ preserves a defensive area to the south of the wall. The Massenberg Castle lies to the south of this. The Vischer print of 1681 of the west side of the town shows that the wall partly consisted of fortified houses and that additional fortifications had been added, particularly in the area of the Glacis
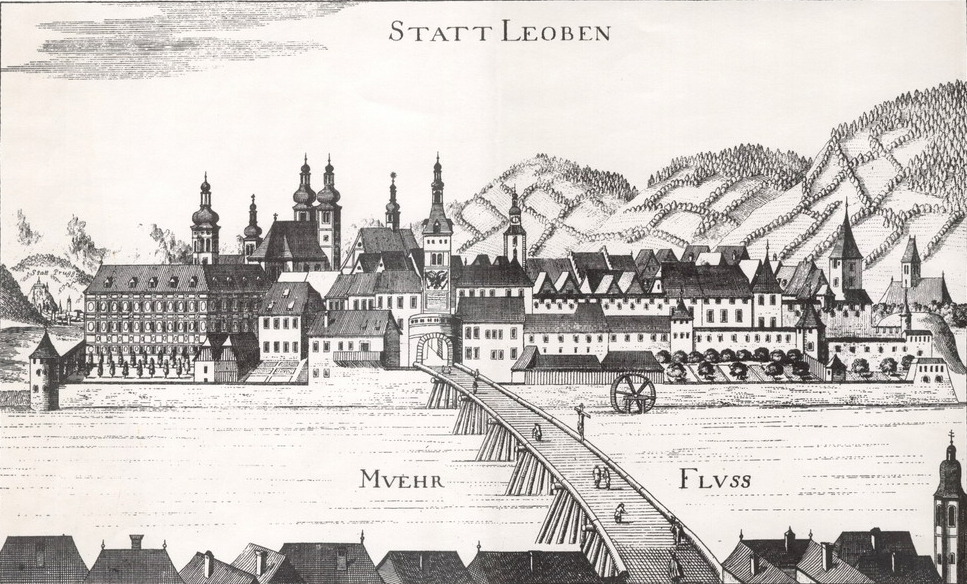
Vischer Leoben 1681

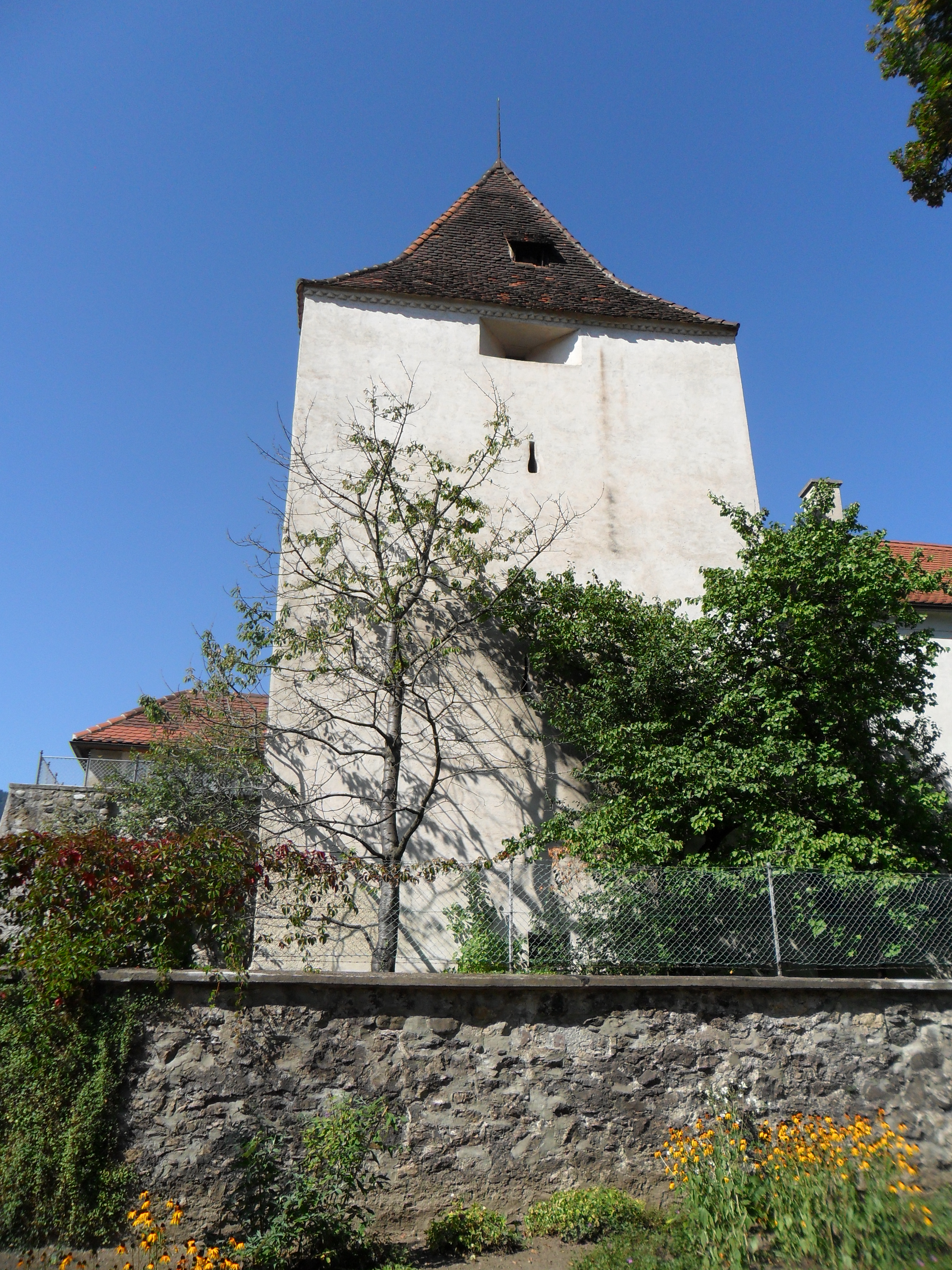
FreimannsturmLeoben

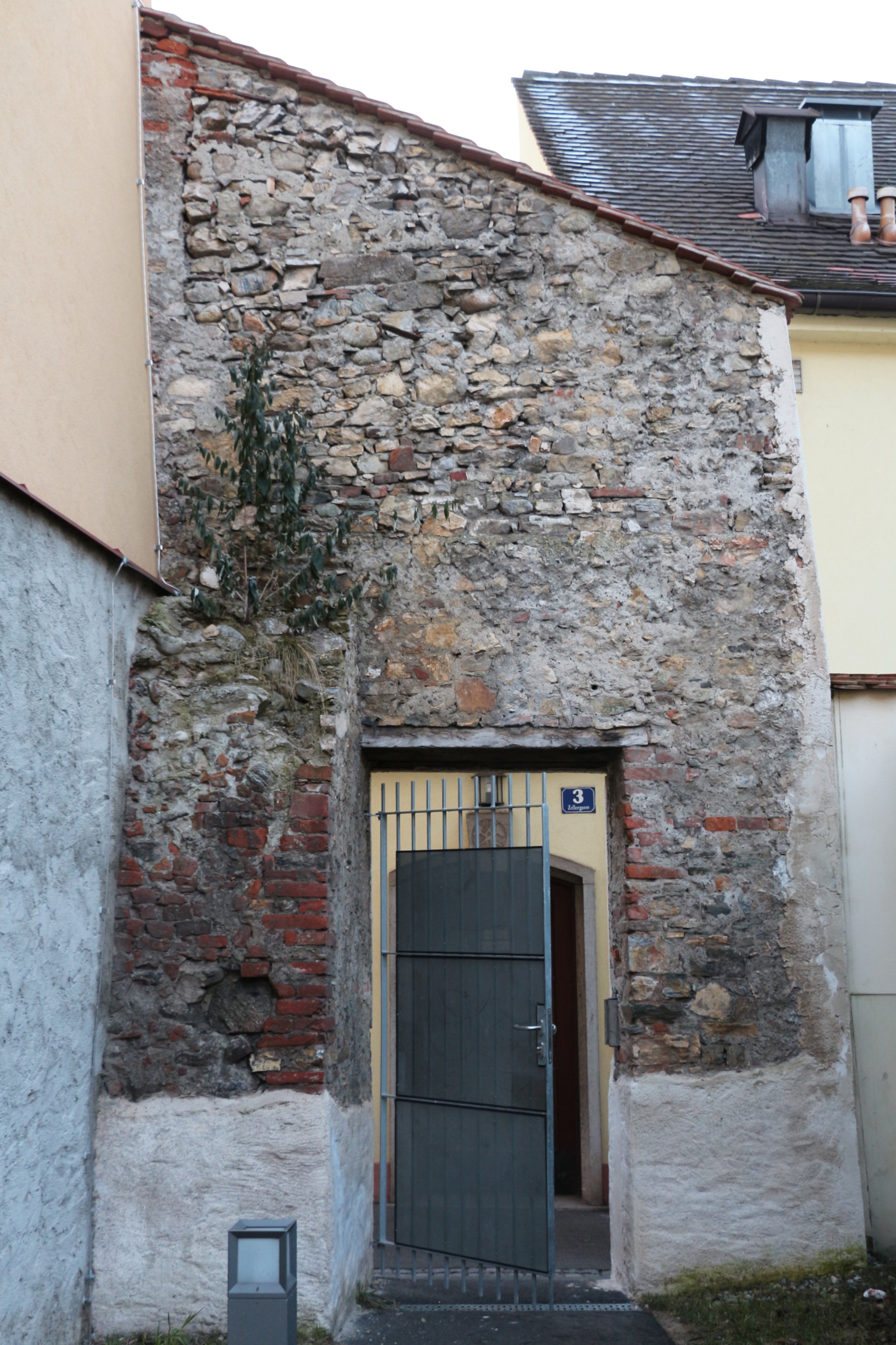
Leoben walls - Zellergasse

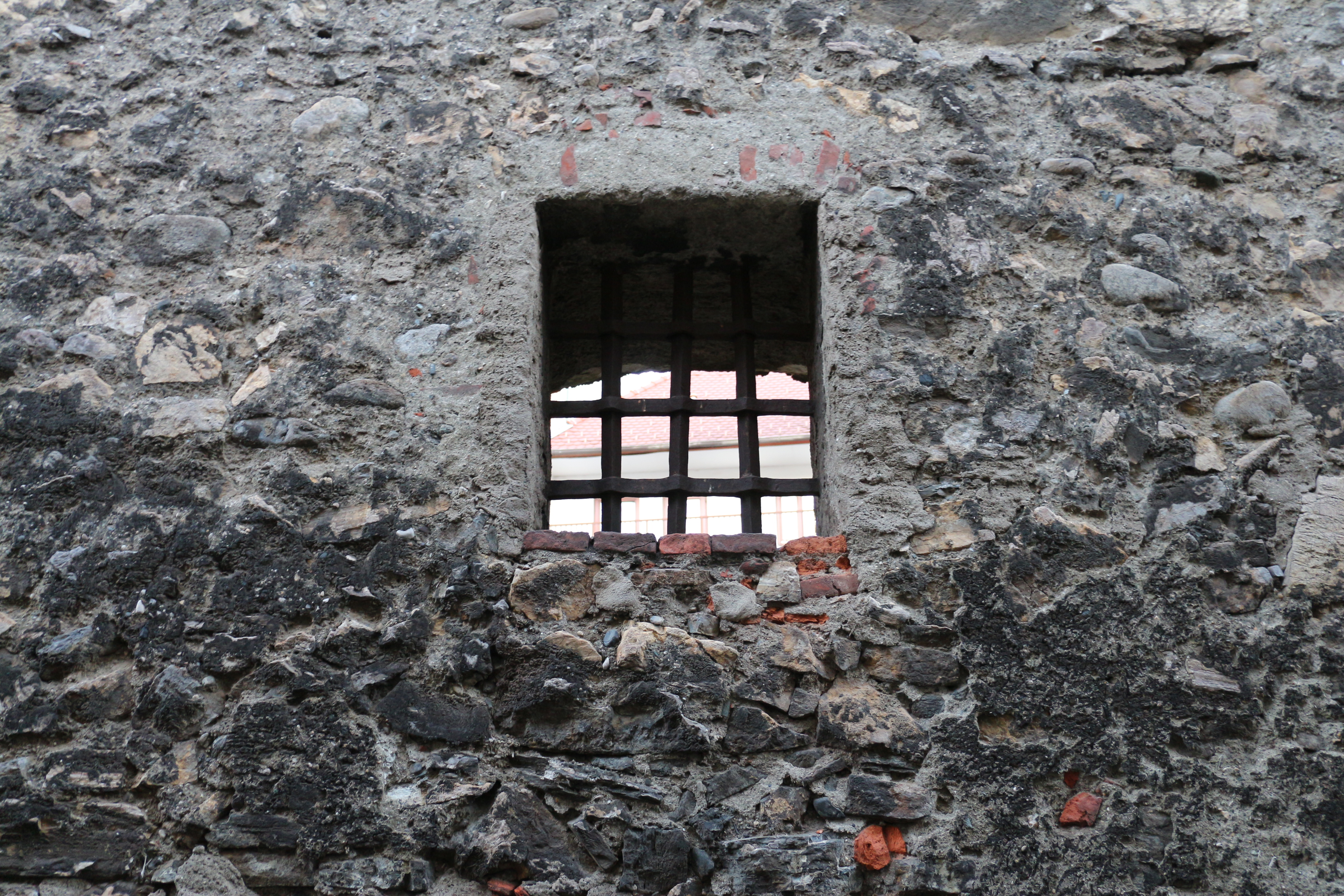
Stadtmauer Leoben

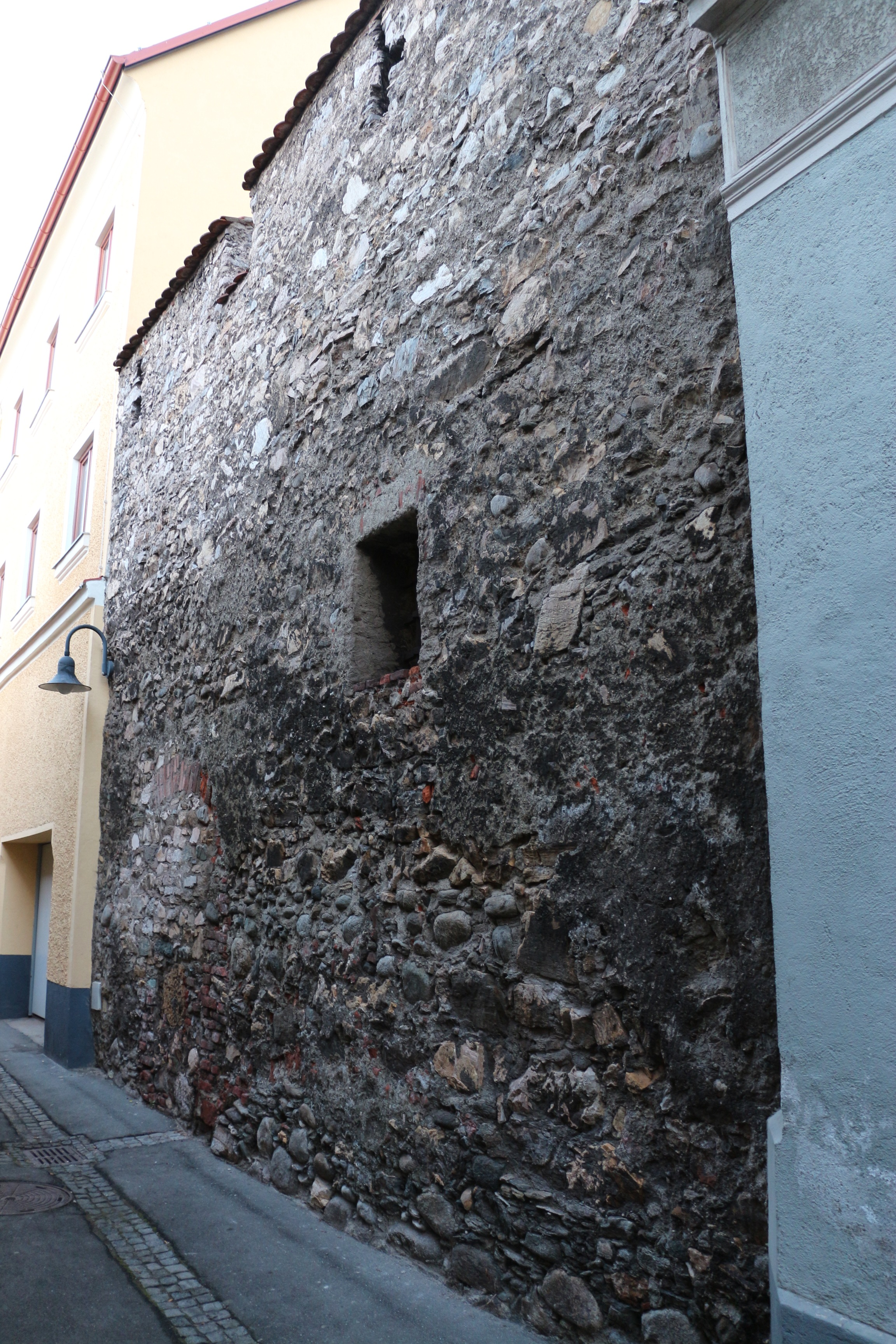
Stadtmauer Leoben
- Mürzzuschlag was first mentioned in 1227 and granted an ‘Eisenrecht’, a charter for mining and processing iron, by Duke Rudolf IV of Austria in 1360. The walls were built between 1483 and 1487 with two gate-towere and three defensive towers. The defences were largely demolished in 1830 and 1903, apart from one tower. The layout was rectangular, with a spindle-shaped marketplace.
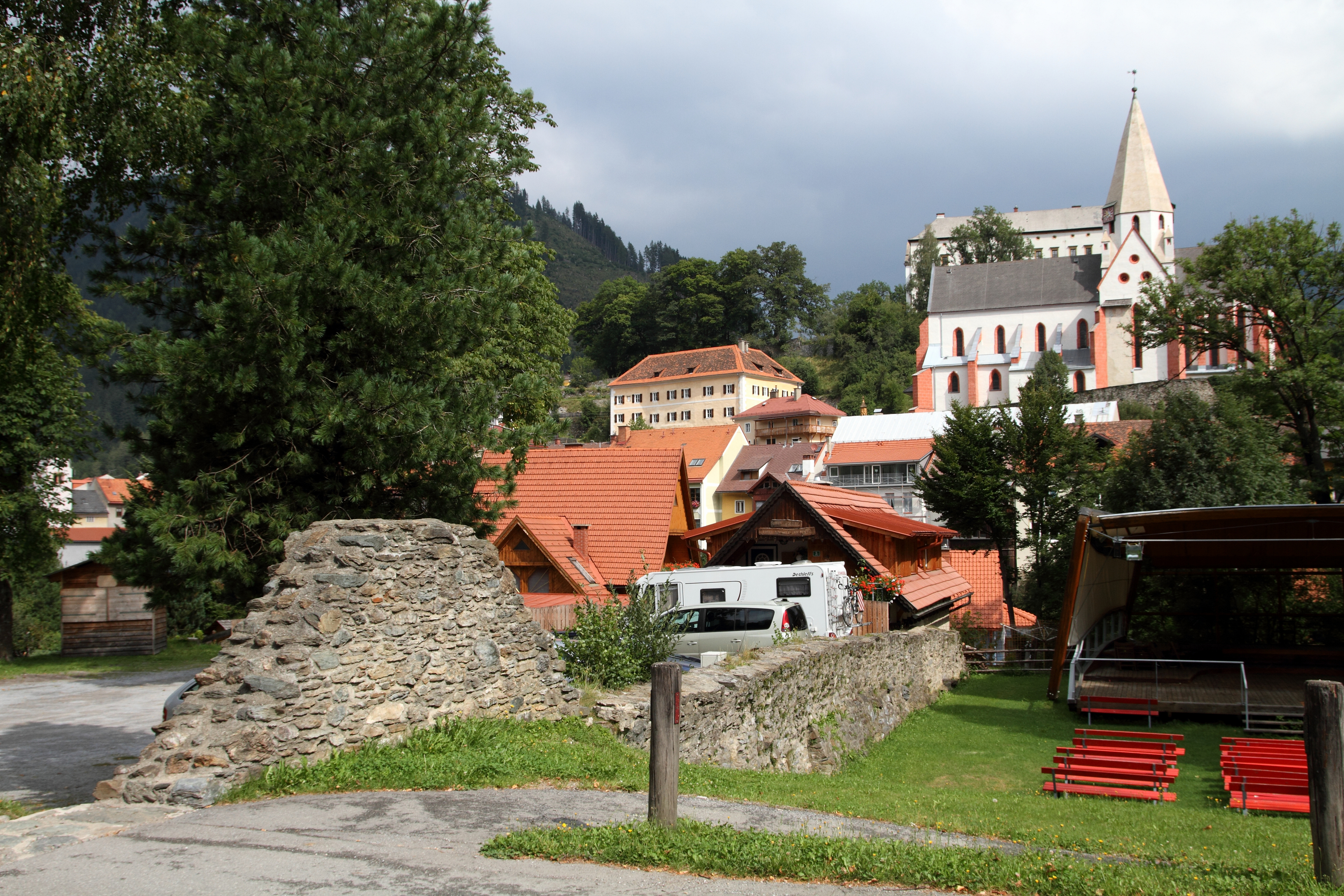
Murau Stadtmauer suedlich der Mur
- Murau was first mentioned in 1250 as the birthplace of Ulrich von Lichtenstein, the noted Styrian poet and leader. The town was granted a charter in 1298 by Otto de Alte von Lichtenstein. The site is very complex with two walled enclosures on either side of the river Mur, which are joined by a bridge. The north town consists of a castle on the higher ground and two conjoined settlements. The east settlement has a Y-type marketplace and the west settlement a long almost spindle-shaped market running parallel to the river. The walls, which largely survive join the Mur to the smaller rivulet, the Rantenbach on the north side. There were two gate-towers in these walls, which have disappeared. Apart from the bridge to the south there were two further bridges with gate-towers – one over the Mur and the other over the Rantenbach. Vischer’s print probably of 1689 shows tightly packed houses, possibly in themselves forming a defensive circuit, along the river Mur, with a further gate-tower leading to bridge to the south walled town. This southern settlement is rectangular. The former Grünfels Castle and the fortified church of St Leonard, are on higher land, and form the south boundary of the walled enclosure. These walls largely survive and on the east is a gate-tower, the Friesachertor. The uniformed Bürgergarde, founded in the 13th century, still exists.
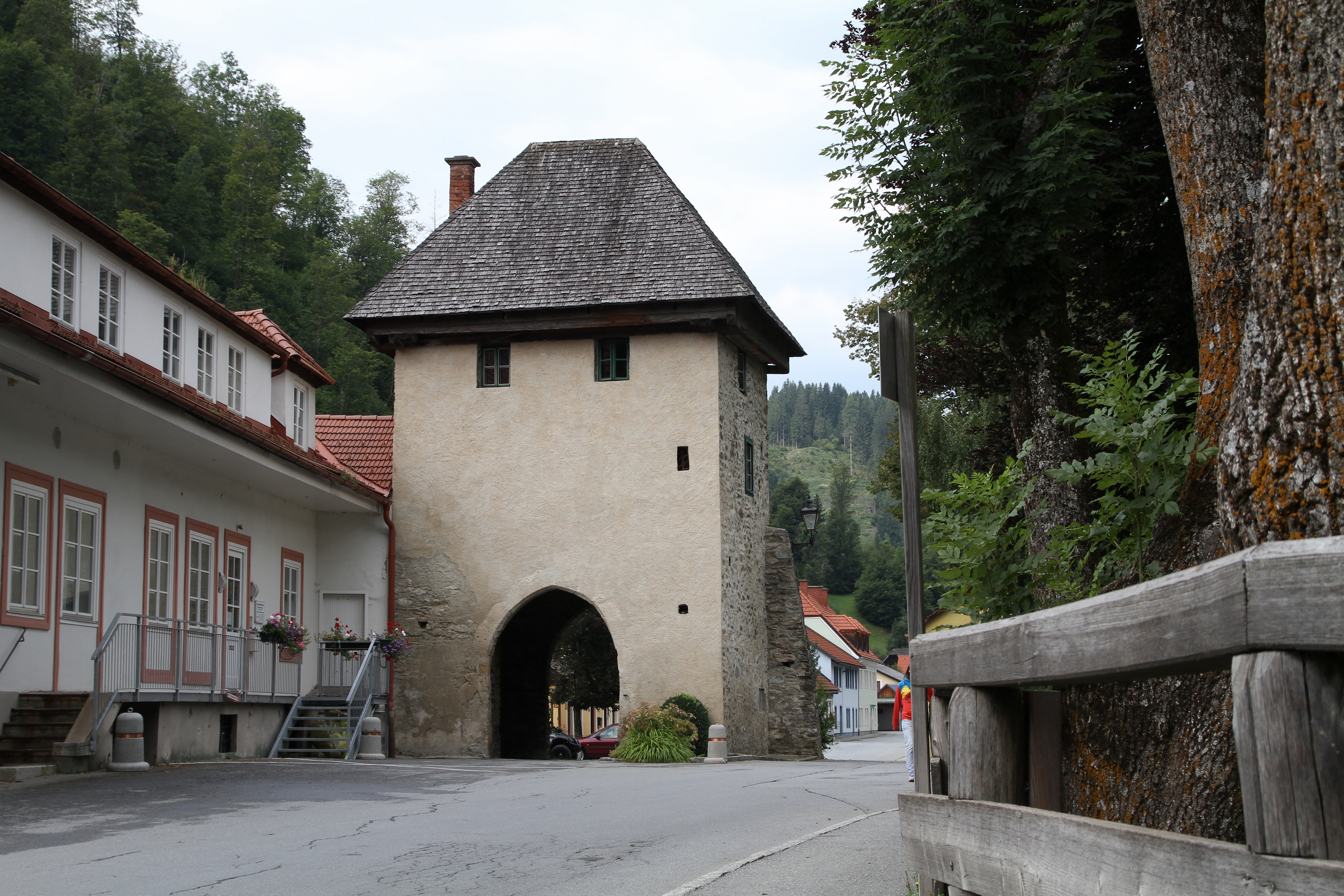
Murau Friesacher Tor

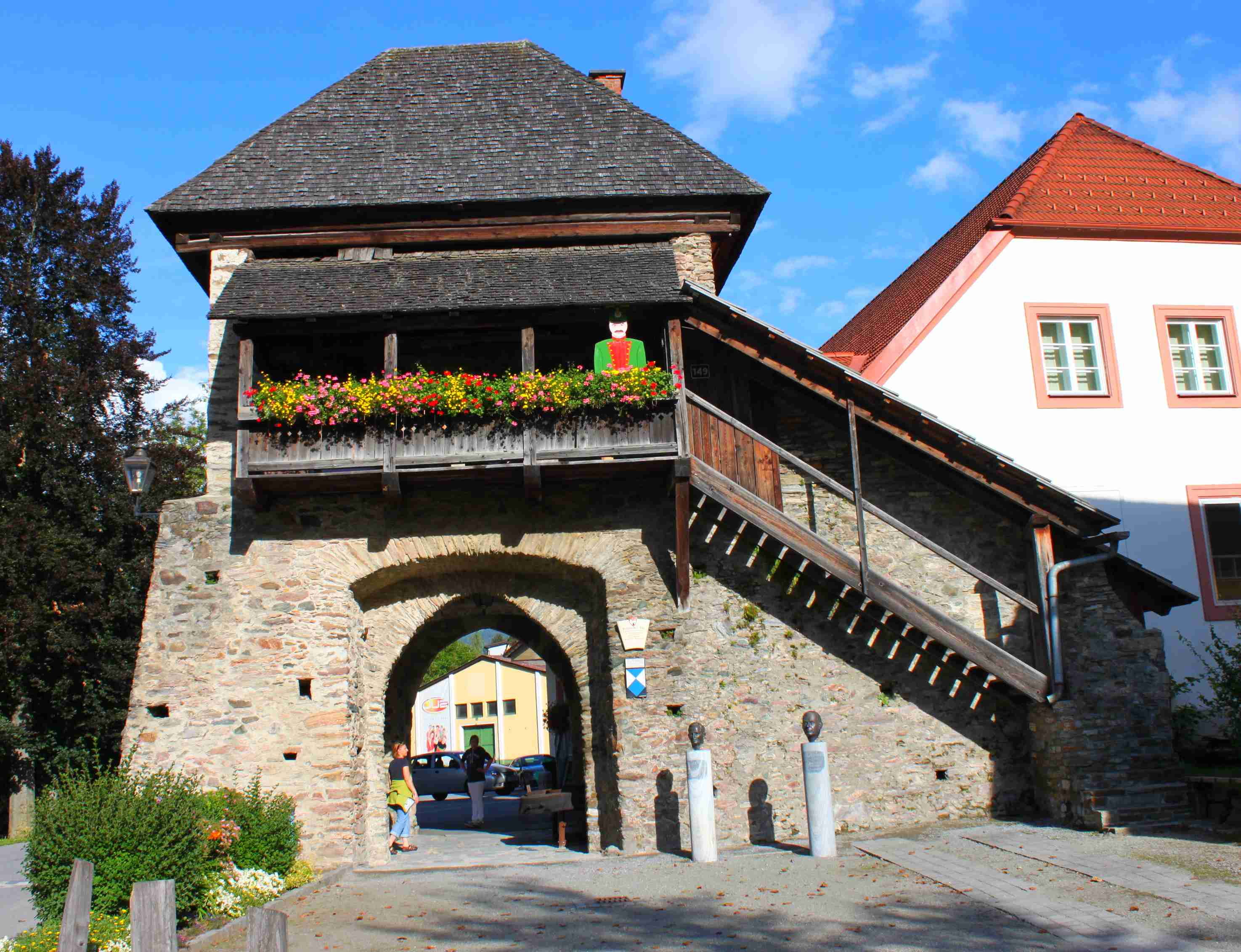
Murau Friesachertor

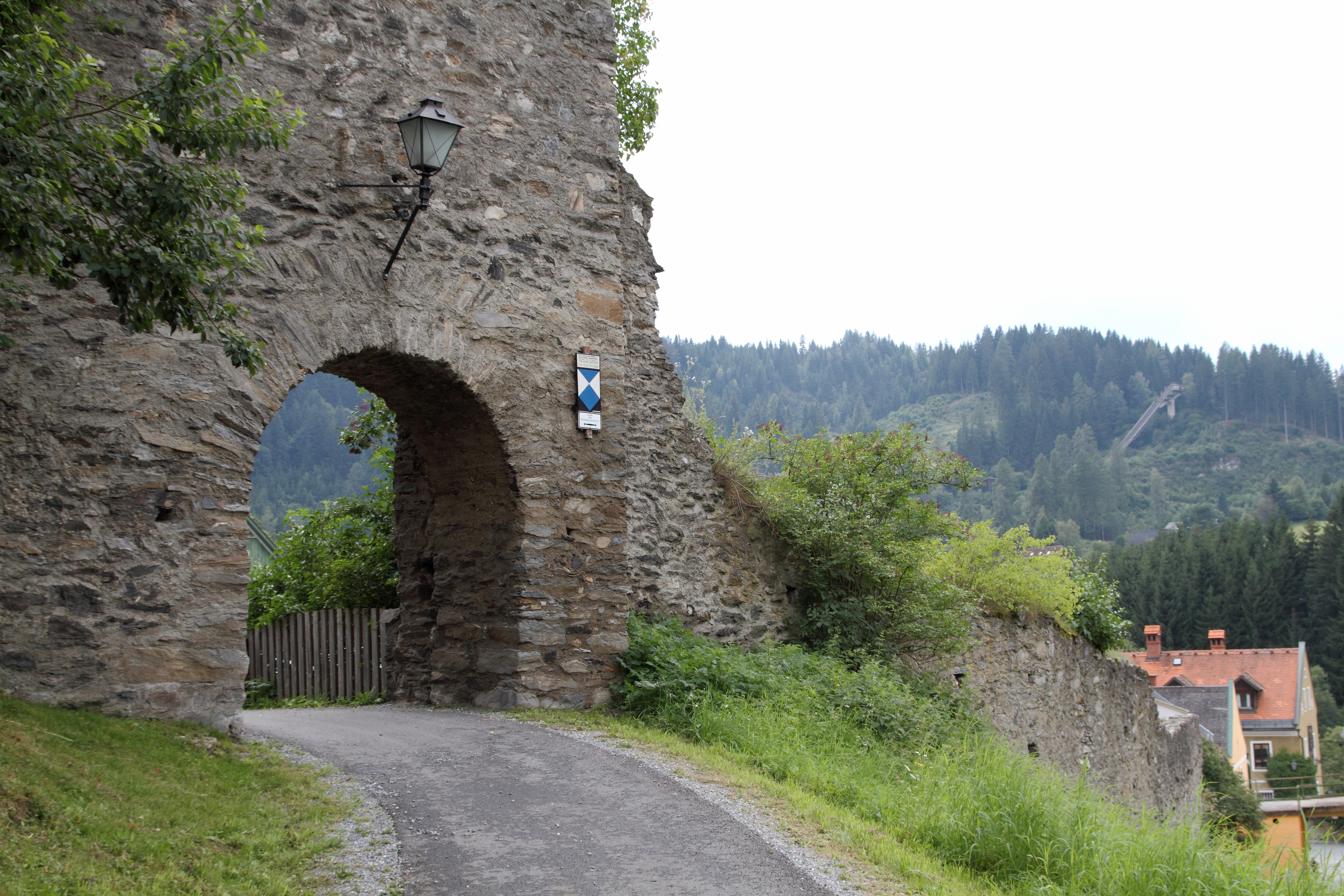
Murau Giessuebeltor

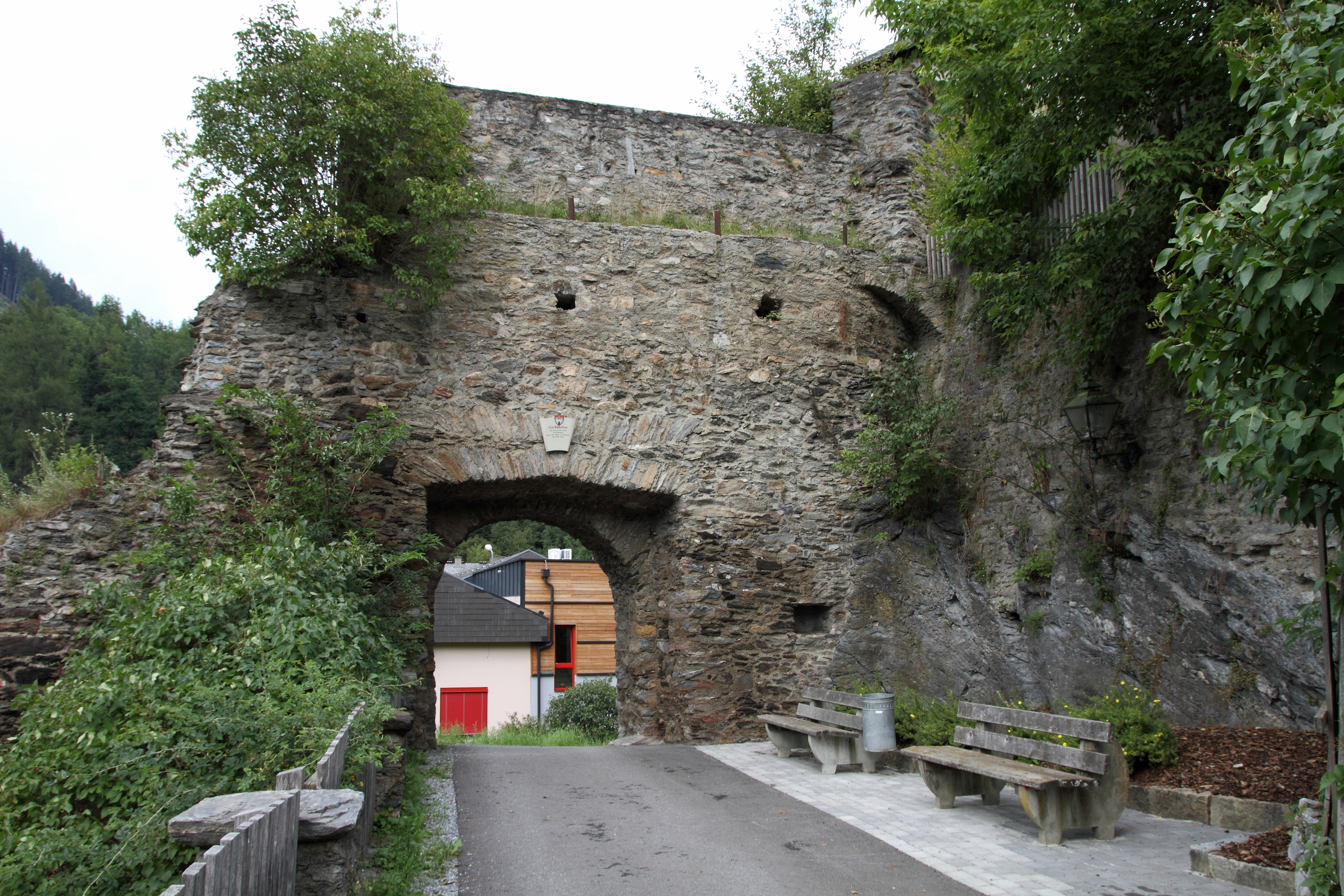
Murau Giessuebeltor
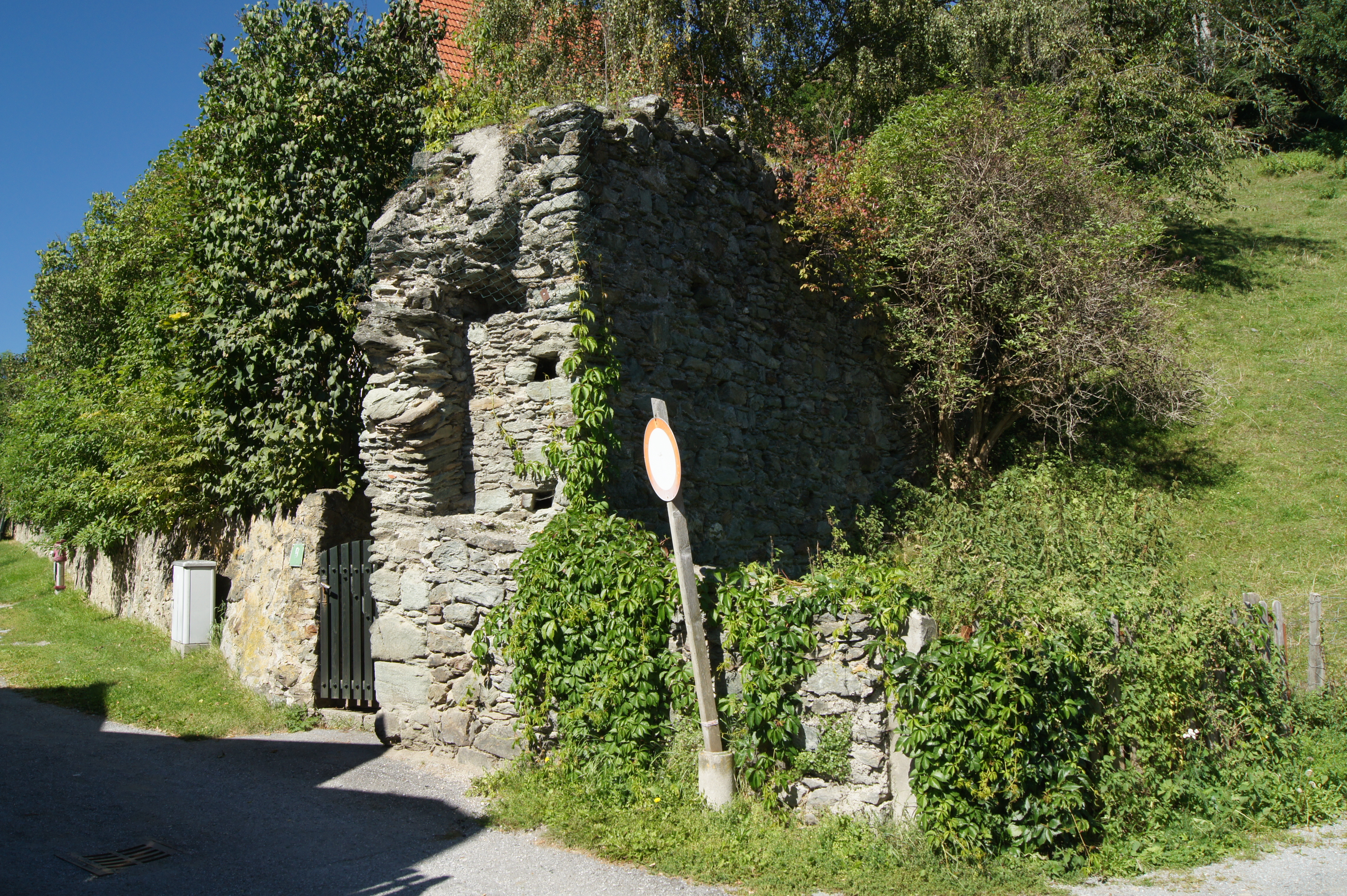
- Ringmauer Neumarkt
  Neumarkt is a rectangular walled town with Forchtenstein Castle at the northwest corner of the defences. Forchtenstein Castle was built before 1224, probably by the Archbishop of Salzburg while the town is first mentioned in 1394. The town is almost rectangular with a long, almost rectangular marketplace, which presumably had gate-towers at each end. The Joseph Landesaufn map of 1786 shows three towers on the northeast and southeast corners, another tower set between these towere on the east side and another tower at the SW. Today the Marburger Strasse skirts the outside of the town on the east and there is a length of wall and the northeast tower surviving, as well as the towers on the southeast and southwest.

- Oberwölz is one of the best preserved Austrian walled towns. The Murtal valley was granted to the Bishop of Freising in 1007 and the Bishop established the Rotenfels Castle as his residence. The town was laid out to the west of the castle. In 1298, Duke Albrecht I gave the Bishop a market and the right to surround it with a wall. The town was granted a charter in 1305. The walls were originally 10 metres high and were completed in 1317. There were 5 Gate-towers, of which three survive, and 8 towers on the circuit. The Schöttlbach stream runs on the west side and the Hintereggertor gate has slots for the provision of a drawbridge. The town has a long rectangular marketplace with the Schöttltor gate to the N.
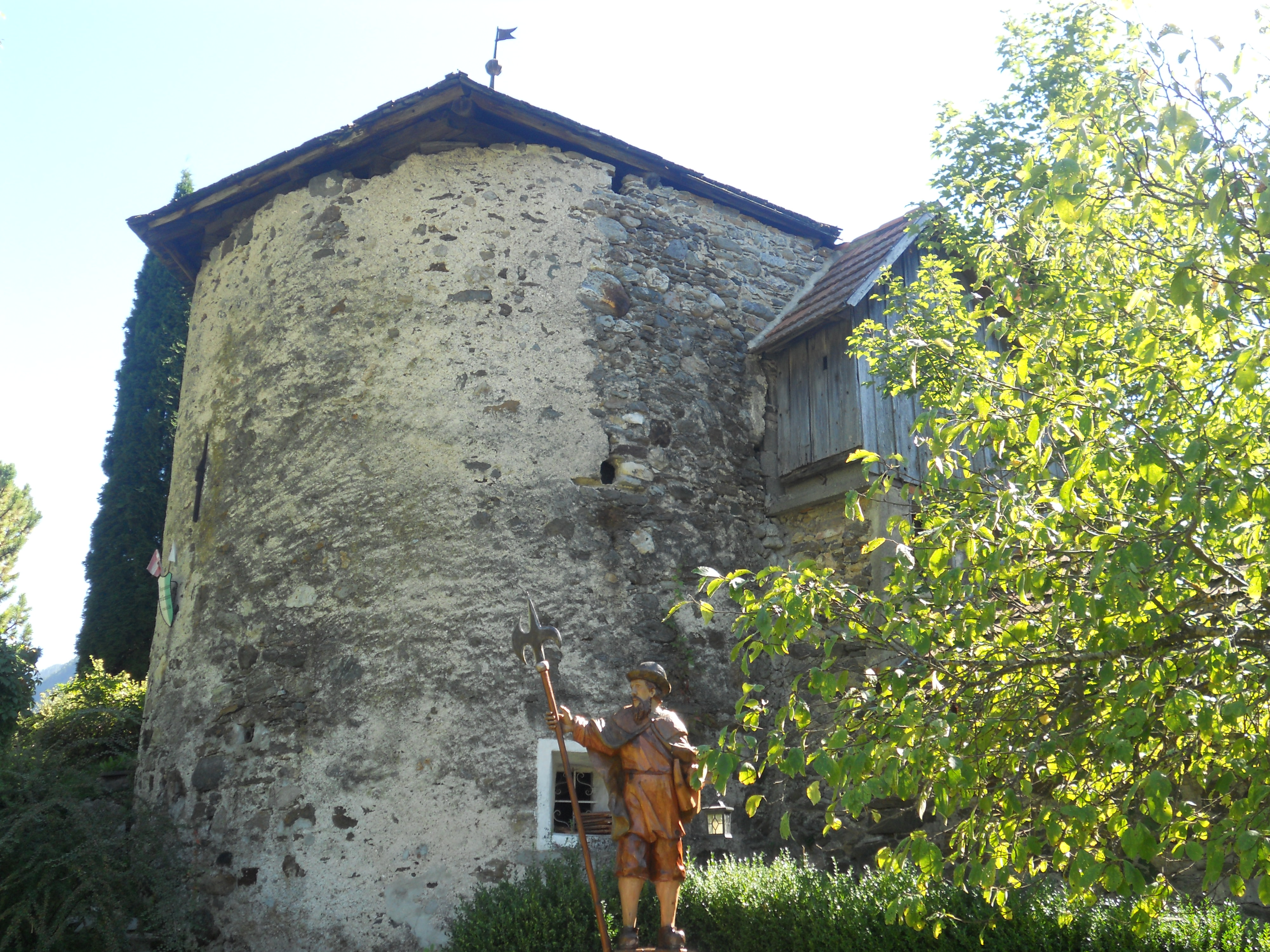
Peggesbichlturm, Oberwölz, early D bastion, probably c. 1317.

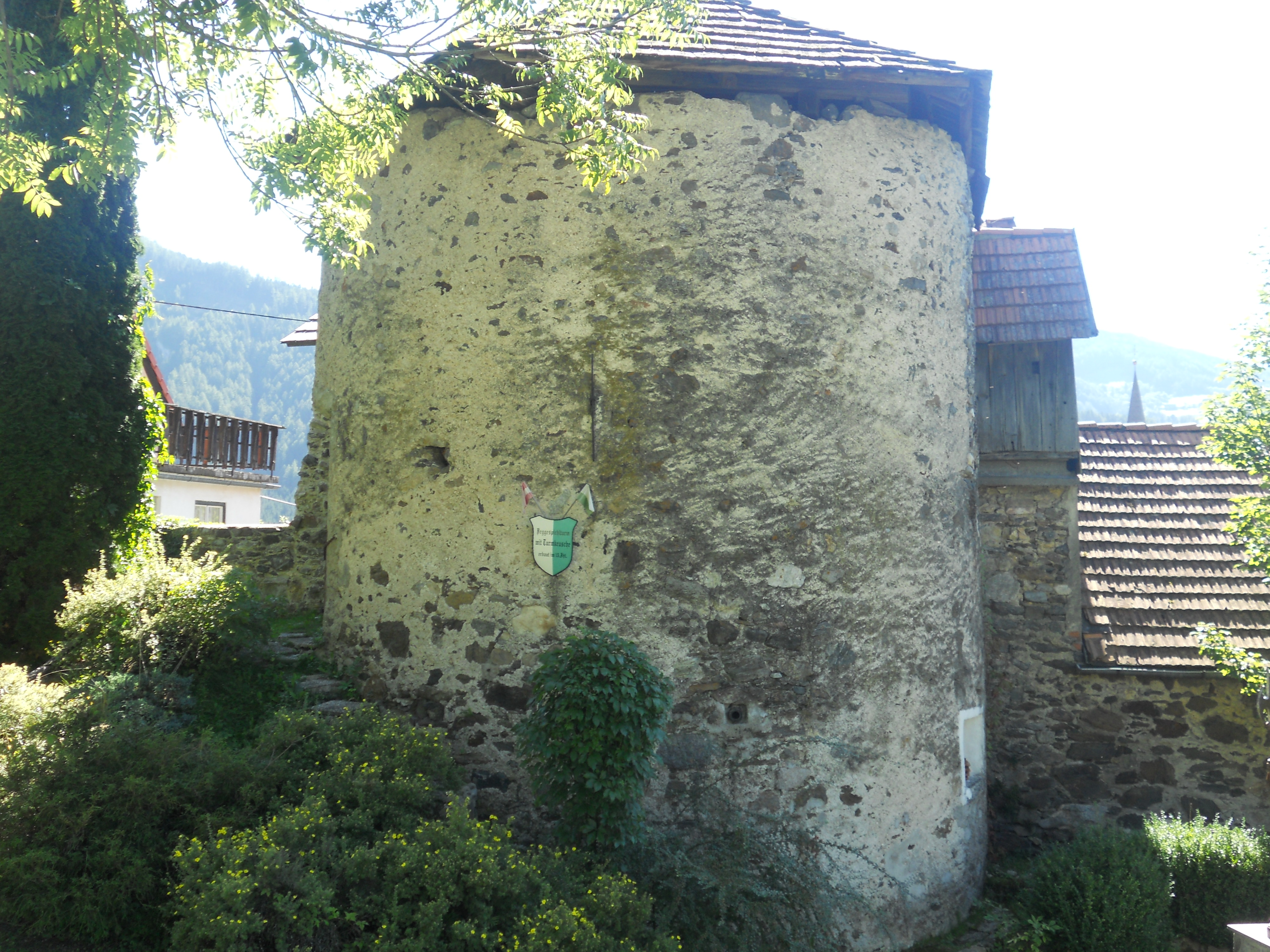
Peggesbichlturm

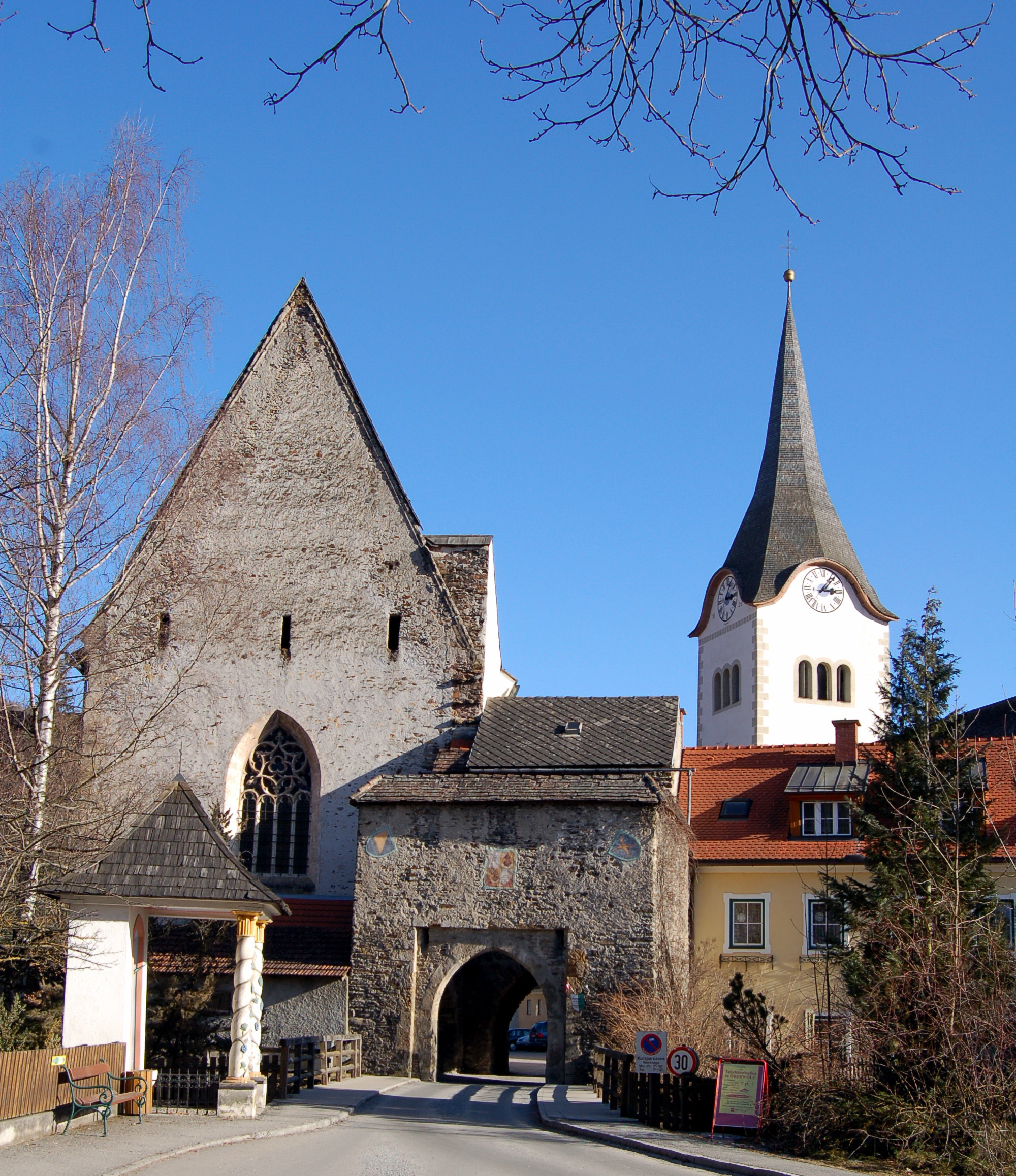
Hintereggertor Stadtmauer Kirchen Oberwölz

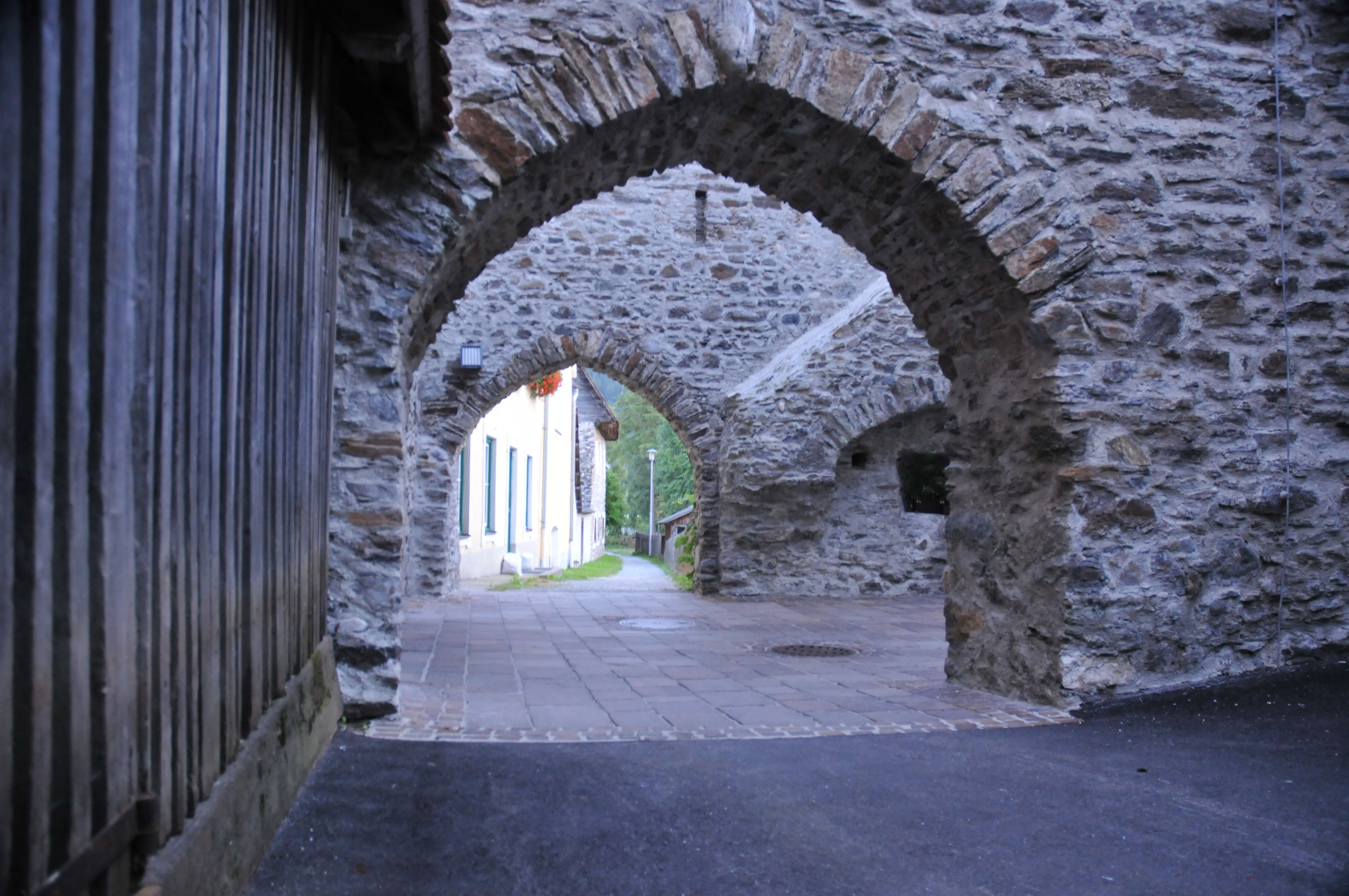
Hintereggertor Oberwölz heading south

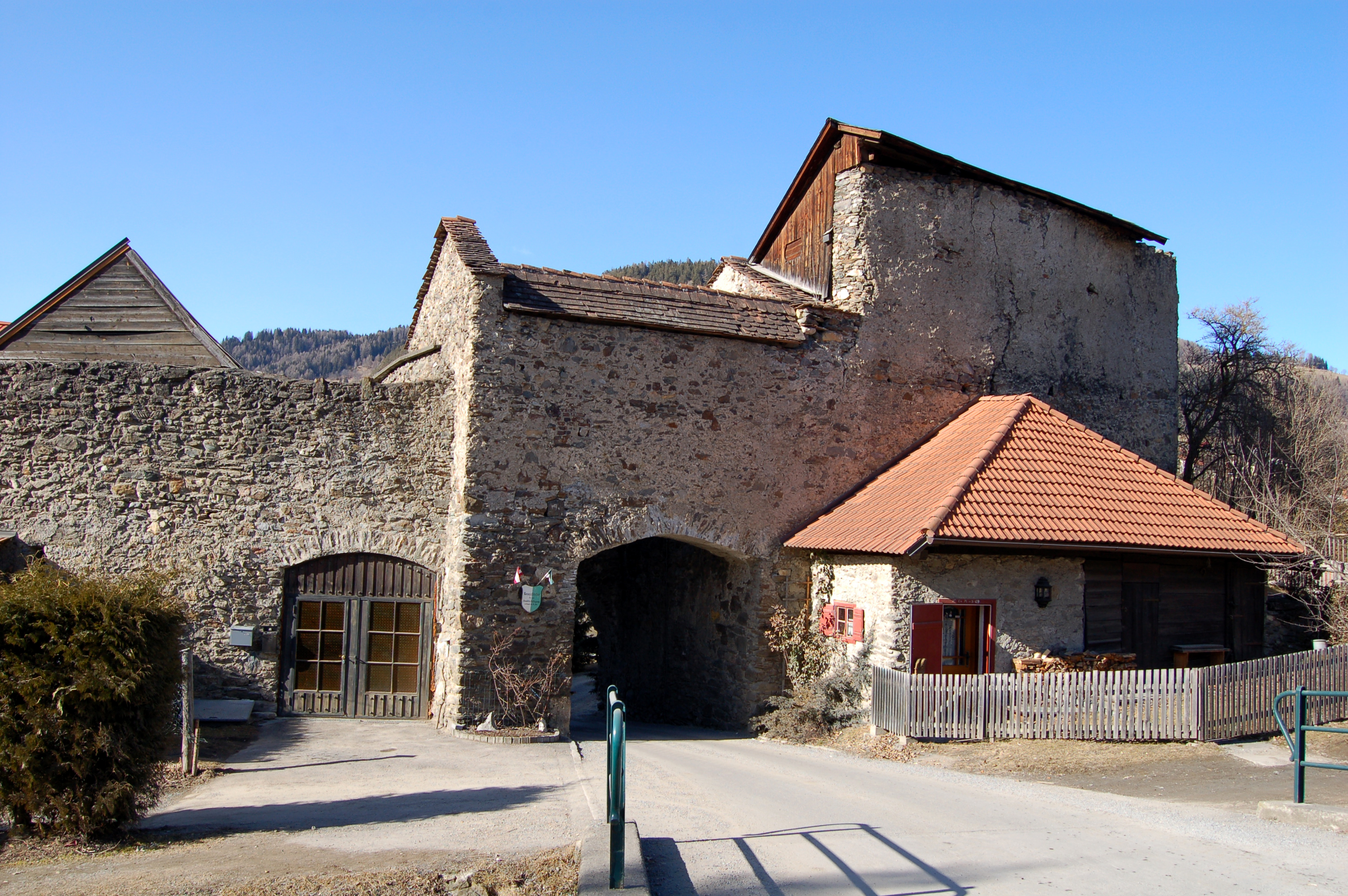
Neugassentor Stadtmauer Oberwölz

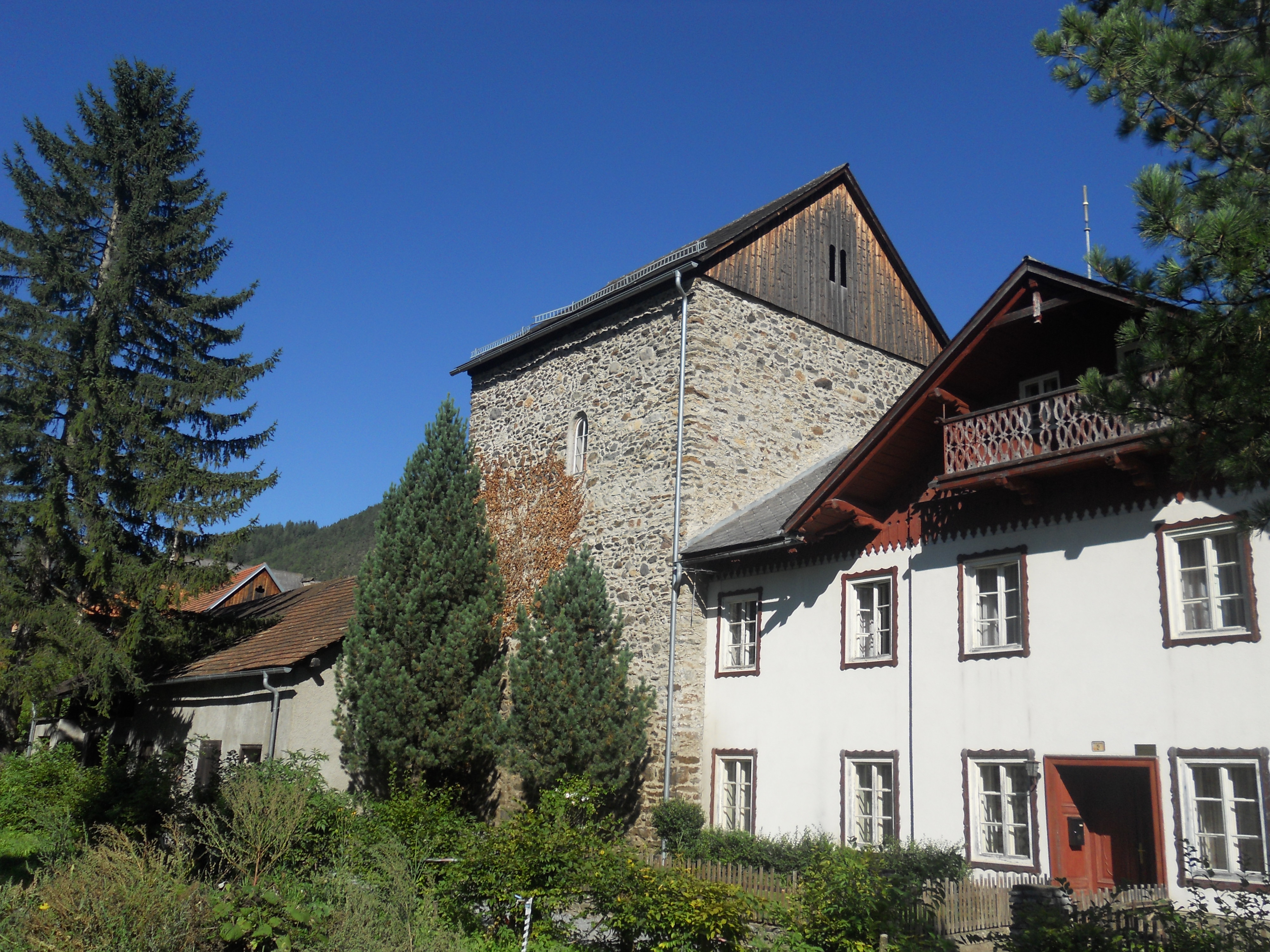
Oberwölz Jormannsdorferturm

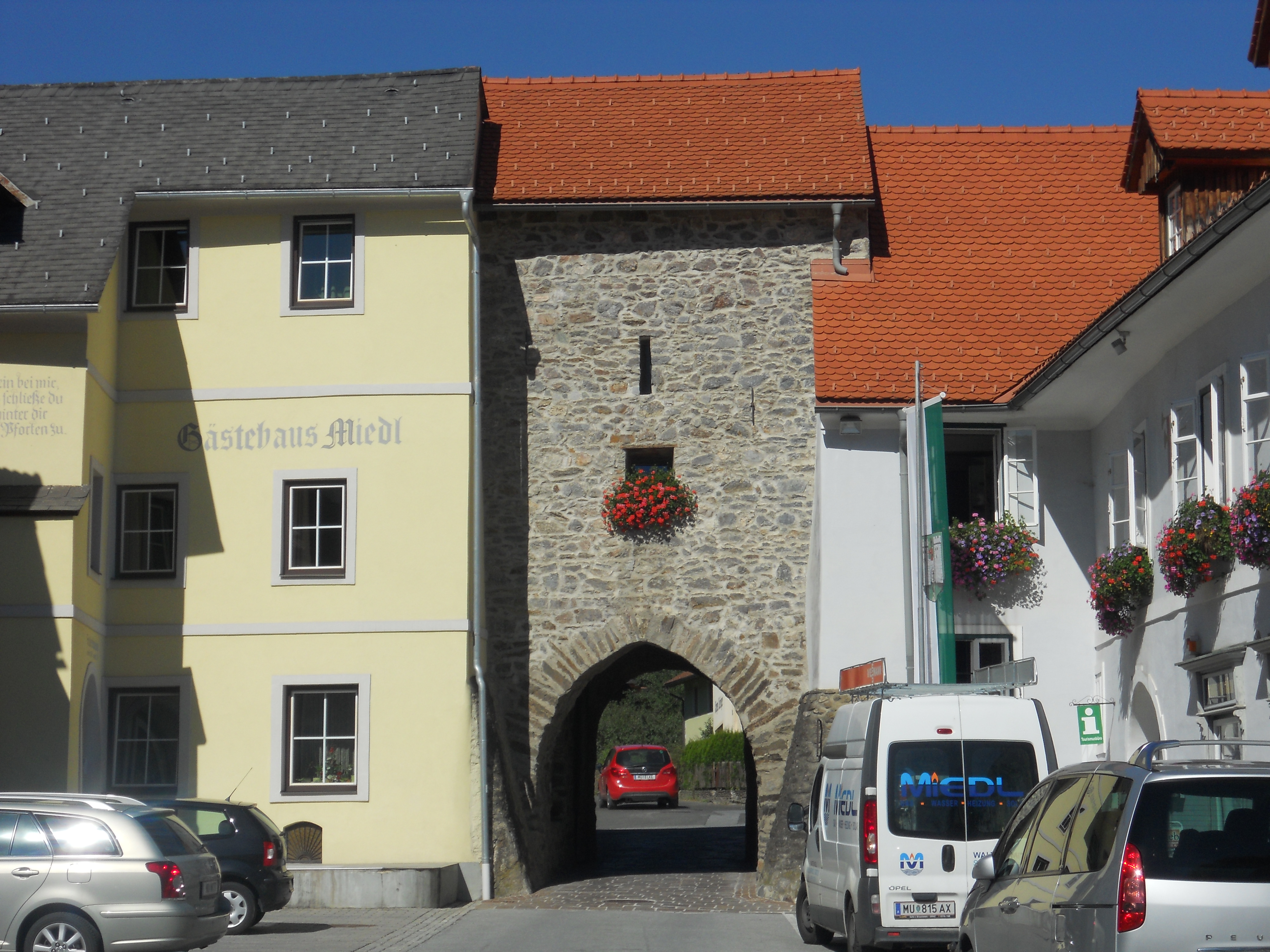
Oberwölz Schoettltor

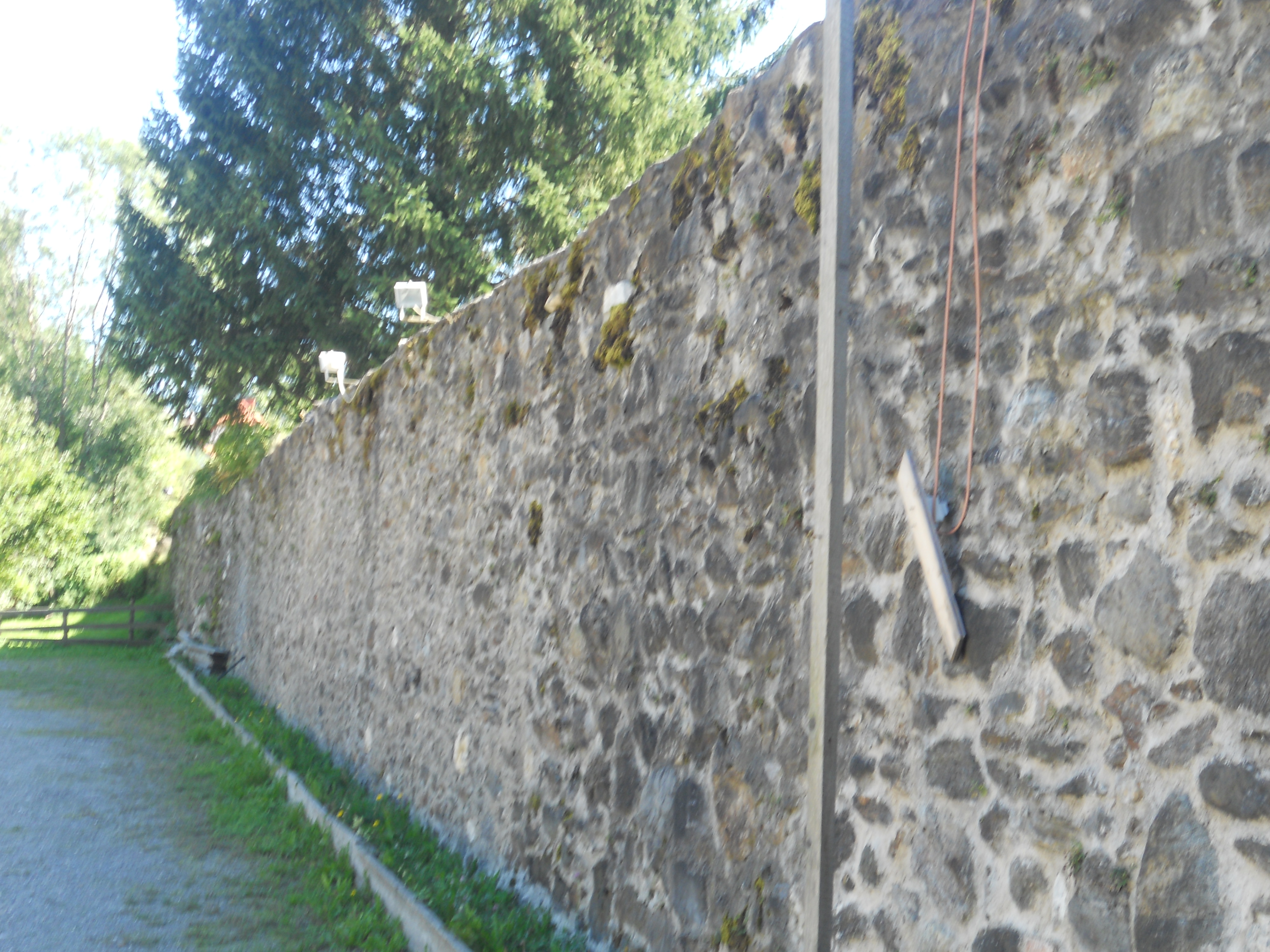
Oberwölz Stadtmauer
- Obdach
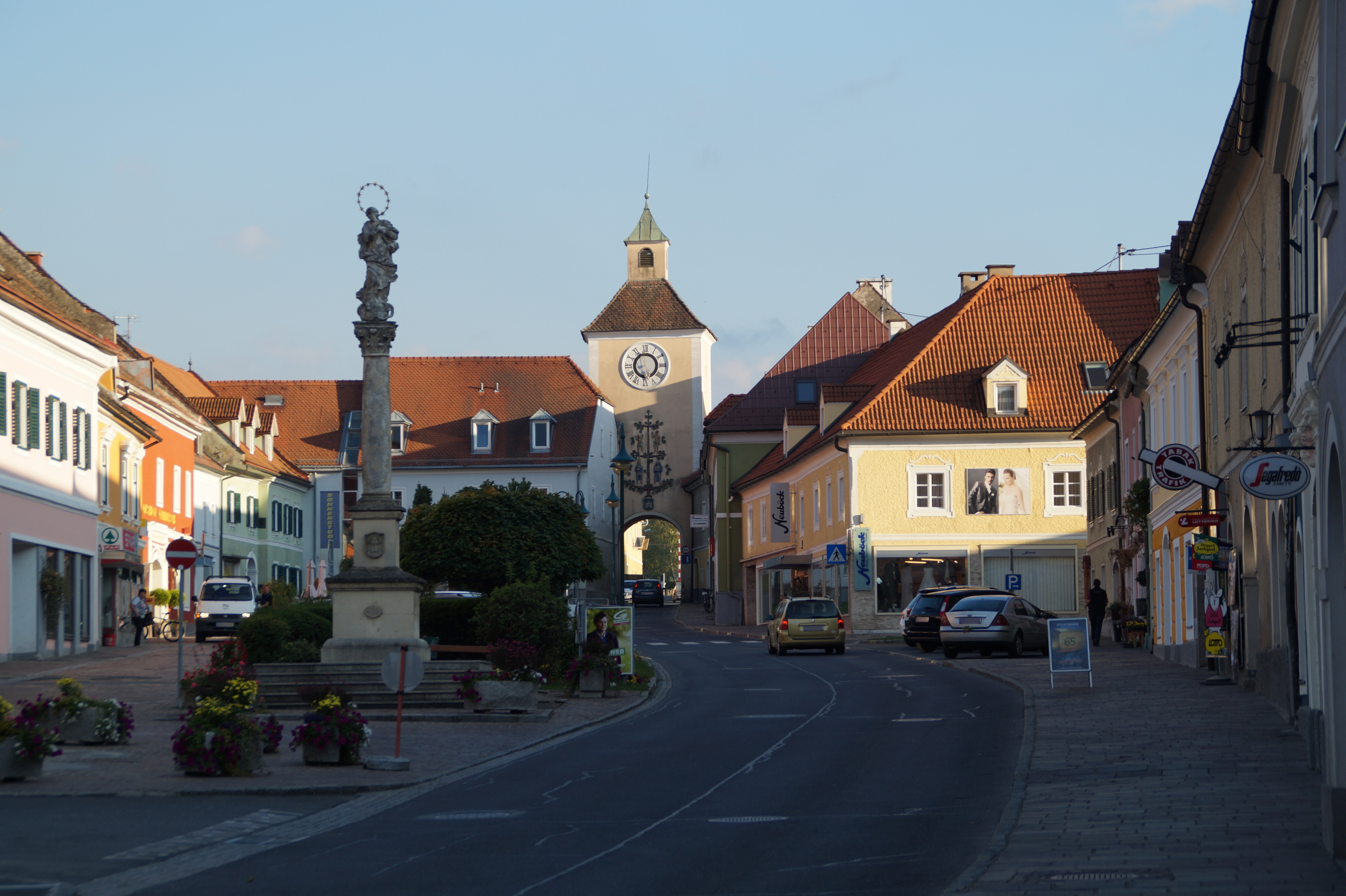
Torturm Obdach

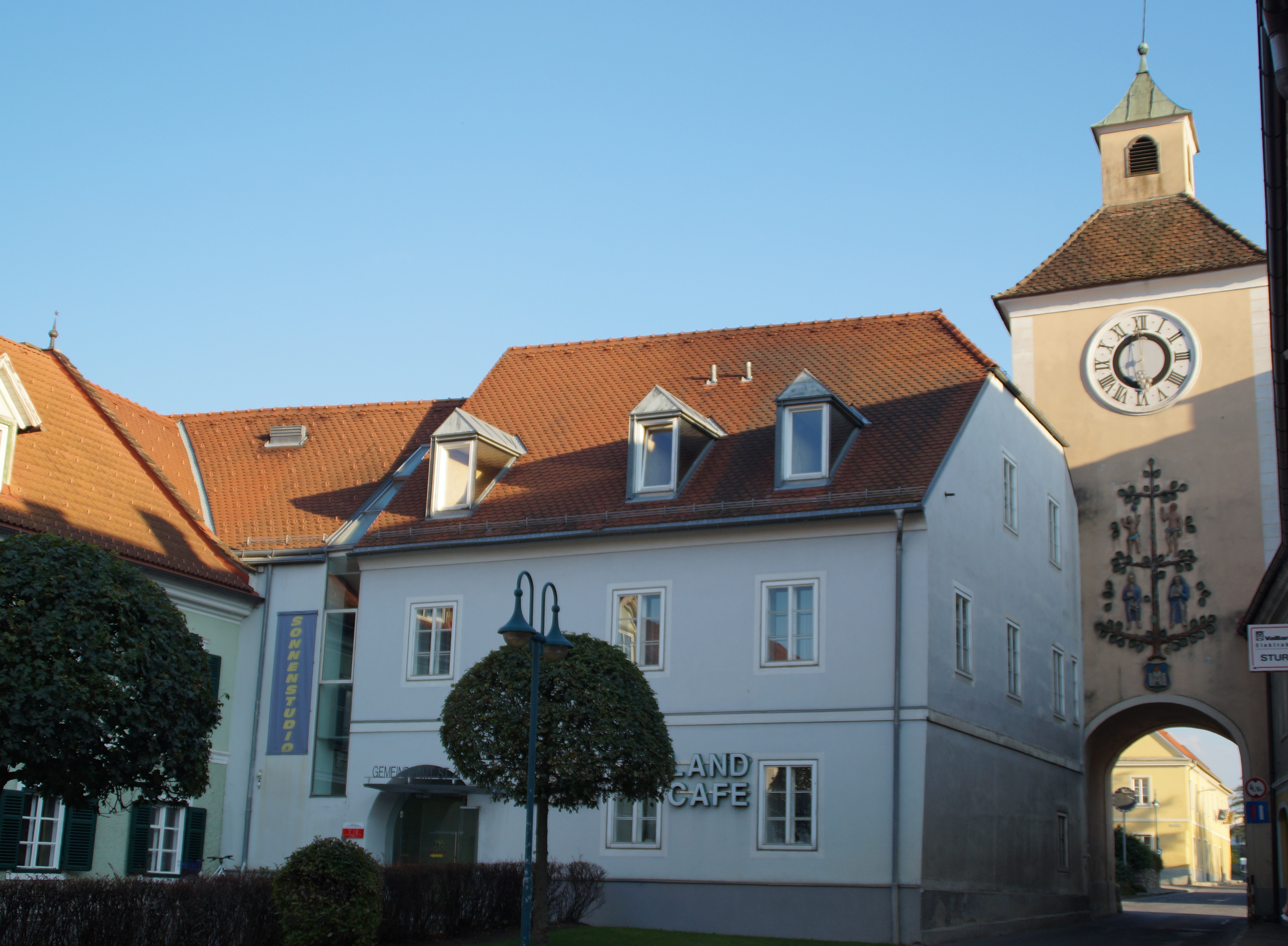
Gemeindeamt St Anna Obdach

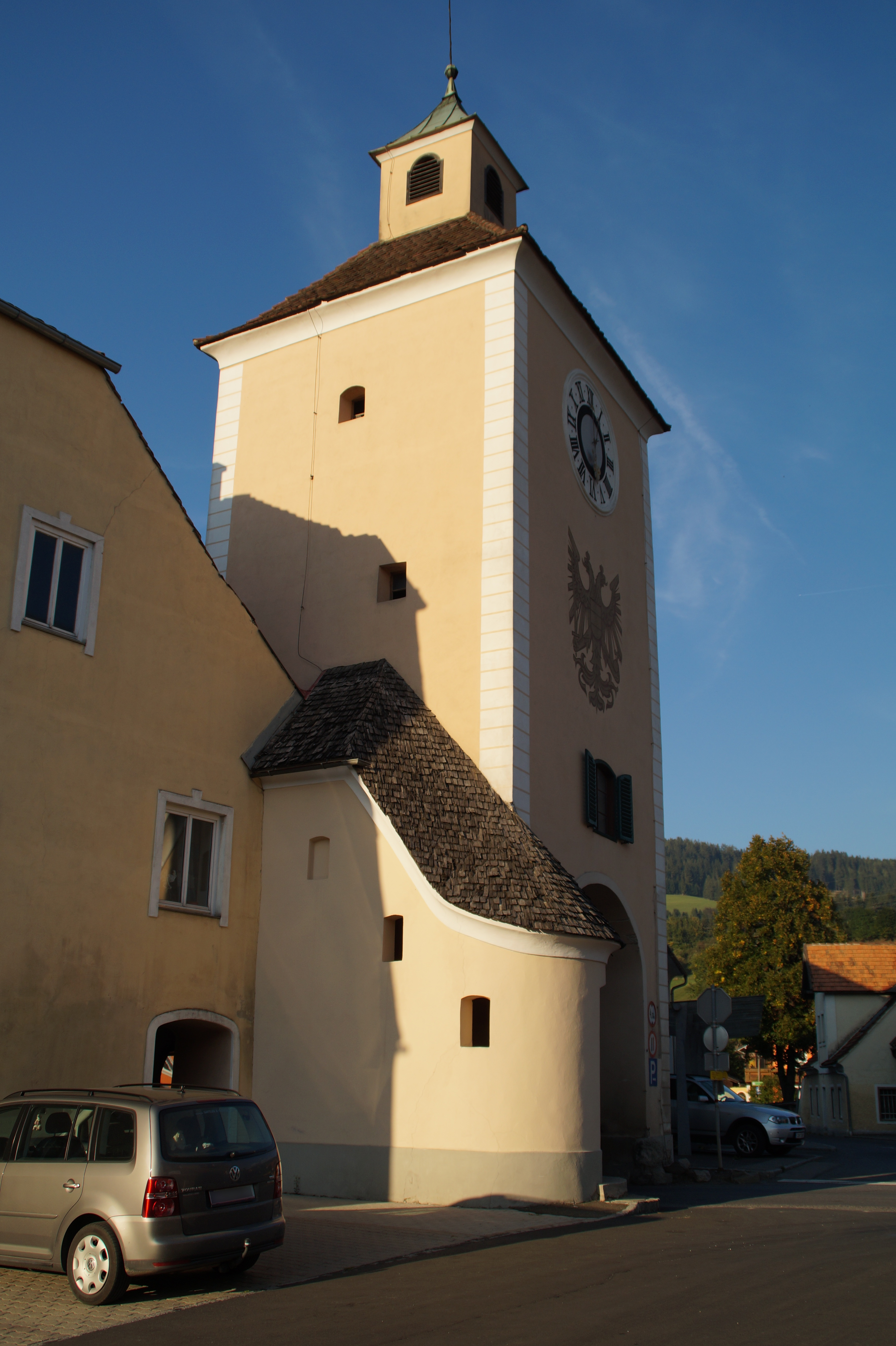
Ringmauer Hauptstr44 Obdach

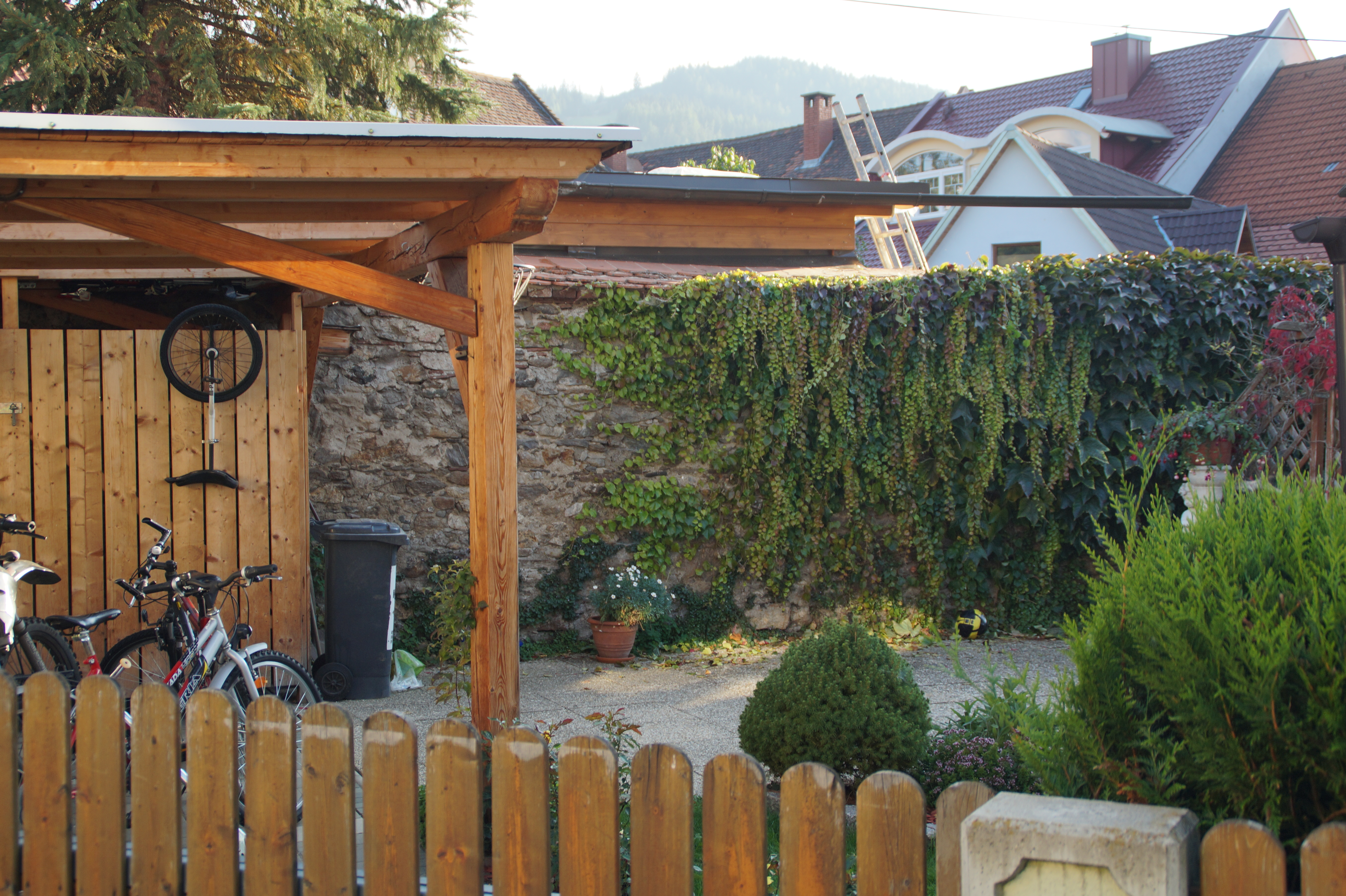
Ringmauer Hauptstr17 Obdach
- Radkersburg is the only Austrian town to have extensive remains of Renaissance Italian style defences. The town is strategically positioned on an island in the river Mur. It was first mentioned in 1282, the year in which Albrecht I, Duke of Austria (1255–1308) became Duke of Styria. The town seems to have gained a charter in 1299. The new town appears to have been part of the Habsburg scheme for defended trading towns along the Hungarian border of the Duchy of Styria. The medieval walls survive in part and were incorporated into the later defences, while the tower of the parish church was originally a tower on the wall. In 1520 Martino dell’Allio from Scaria was appointed `Maurermeister` in Radkersburg, but it was his son Domenico dell’Allio, later the Habsburg Master of Works for Inner Austria, who started the construction of the new defences with a deep moat and four pointed bastions at the corner and ravelins on the E, south and west sides. The work of D’Allio was continued by Francesco Theobaldi and completed in 1591. In 1582 Radkersburg was elevated to an imperial fortress at the Reichstag of Augsburg. However the defences were far from successful and were devastated by floods and fires. Further alterations took place in the 17th century under Martin Stier and Michael Possaenner, which were completed in 1644. After the abandonment of the fortress in 1773, the fortress lands were given to the town, and were then split up and sold to the inhabitants. The town was made accessible and both the town gates -Grazertor and Ungartor-were removed. However, in 1842, the town was re-garrisoned. Systematic repair and conservation of the defences started in the 1920s.
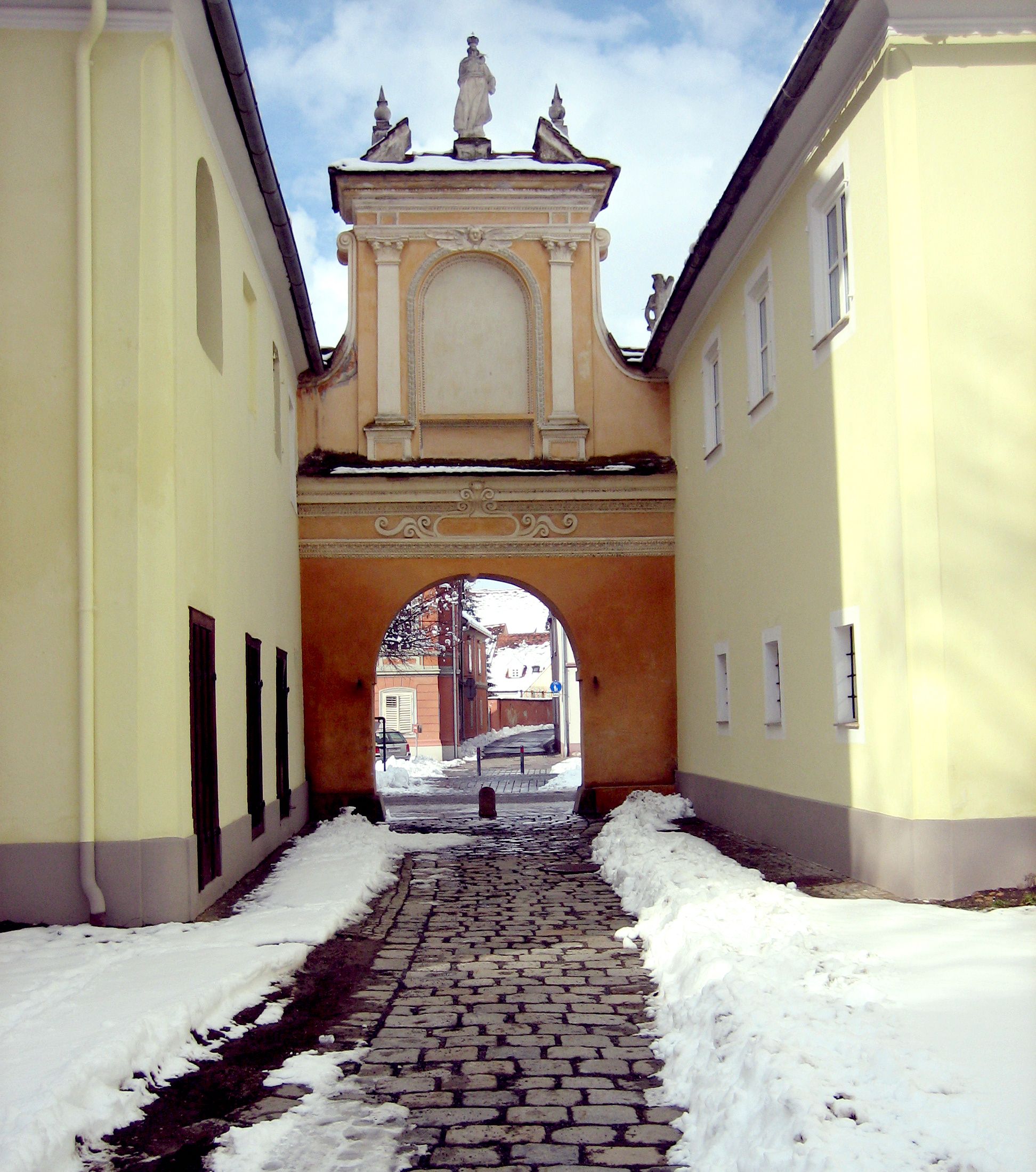
Radkersburg Frauentor

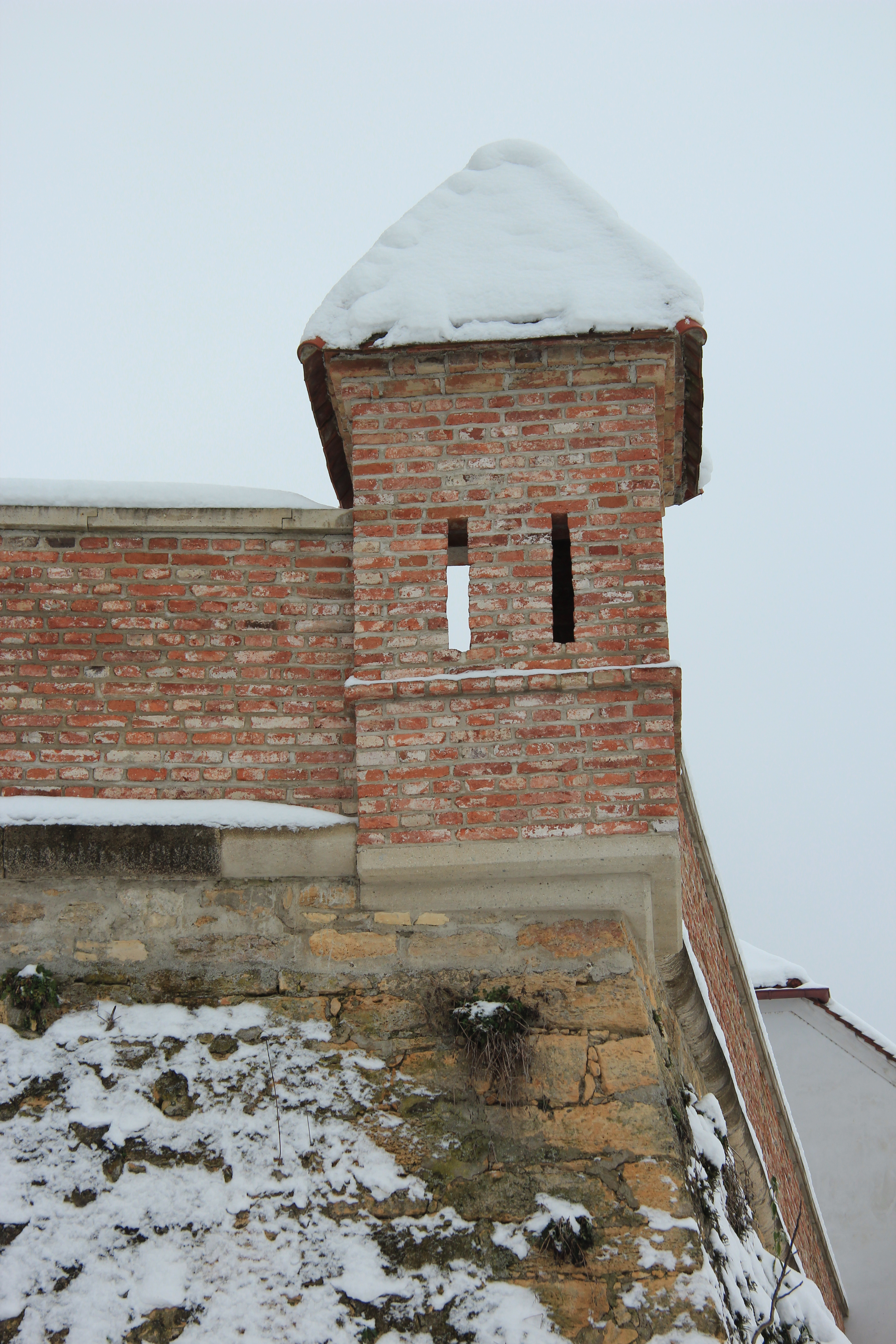
Bad Radkersburg-Stadtmauer

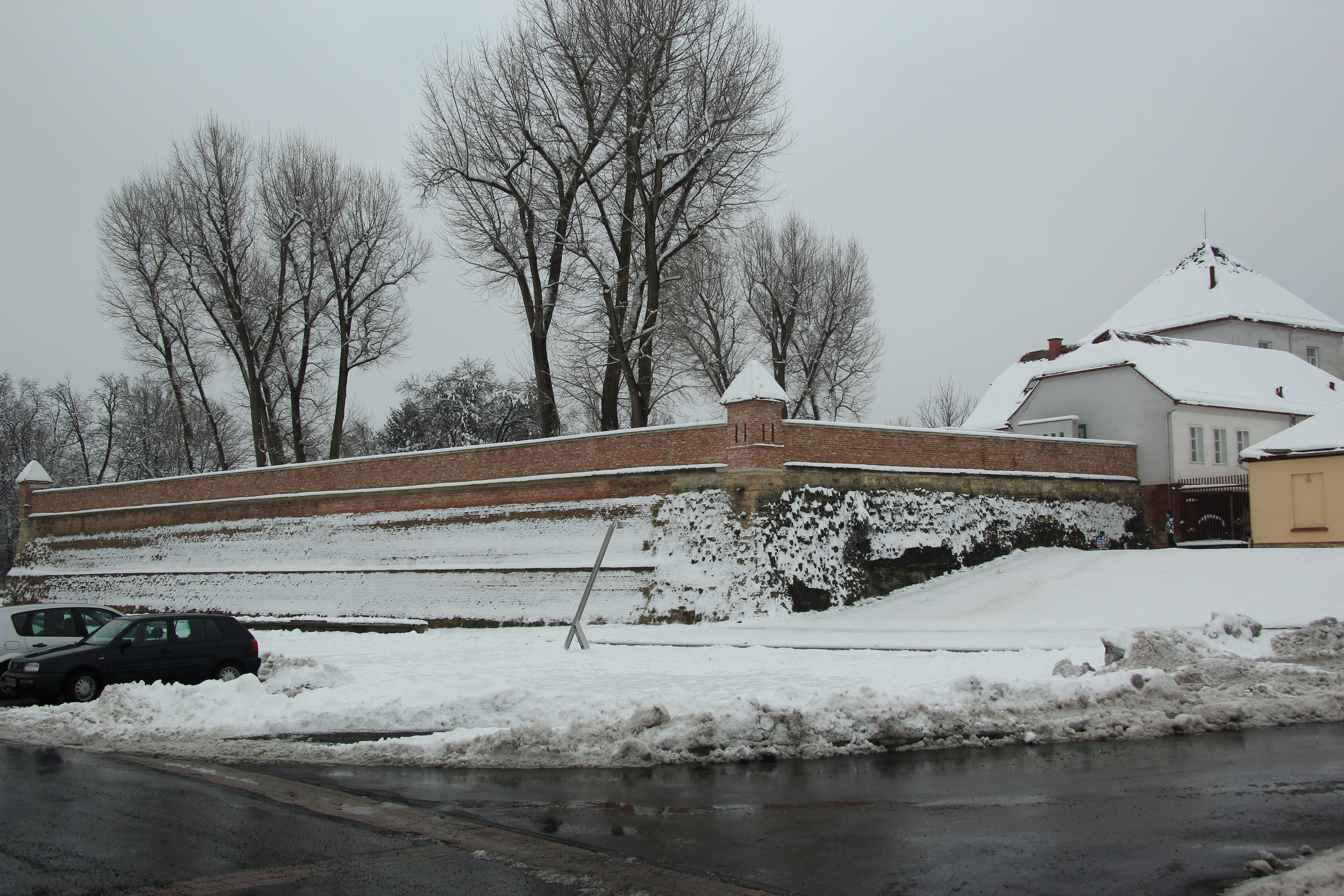
Bad Radkersburg-Stadtmauer

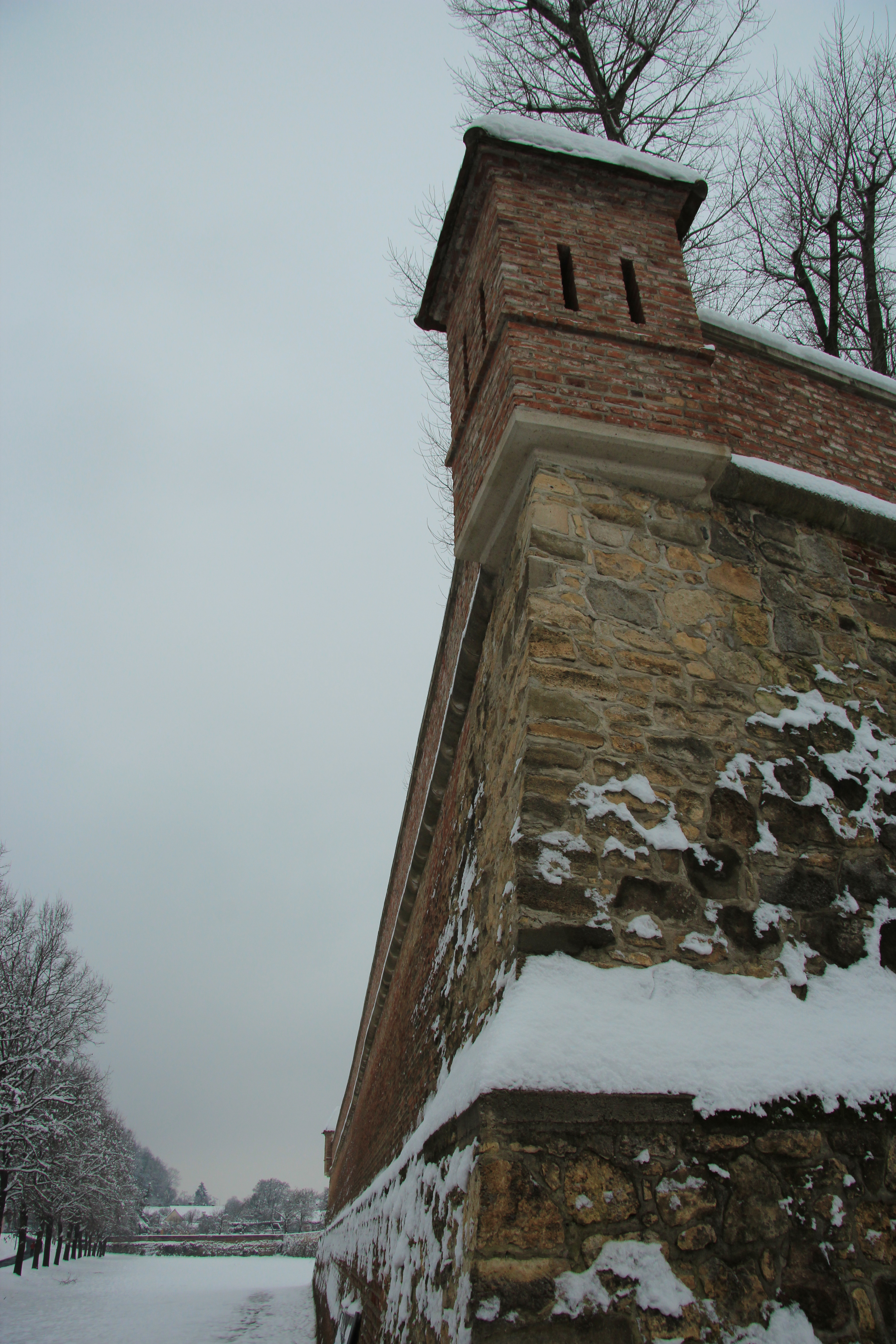
Bad Radkersburg-Stadtmauer

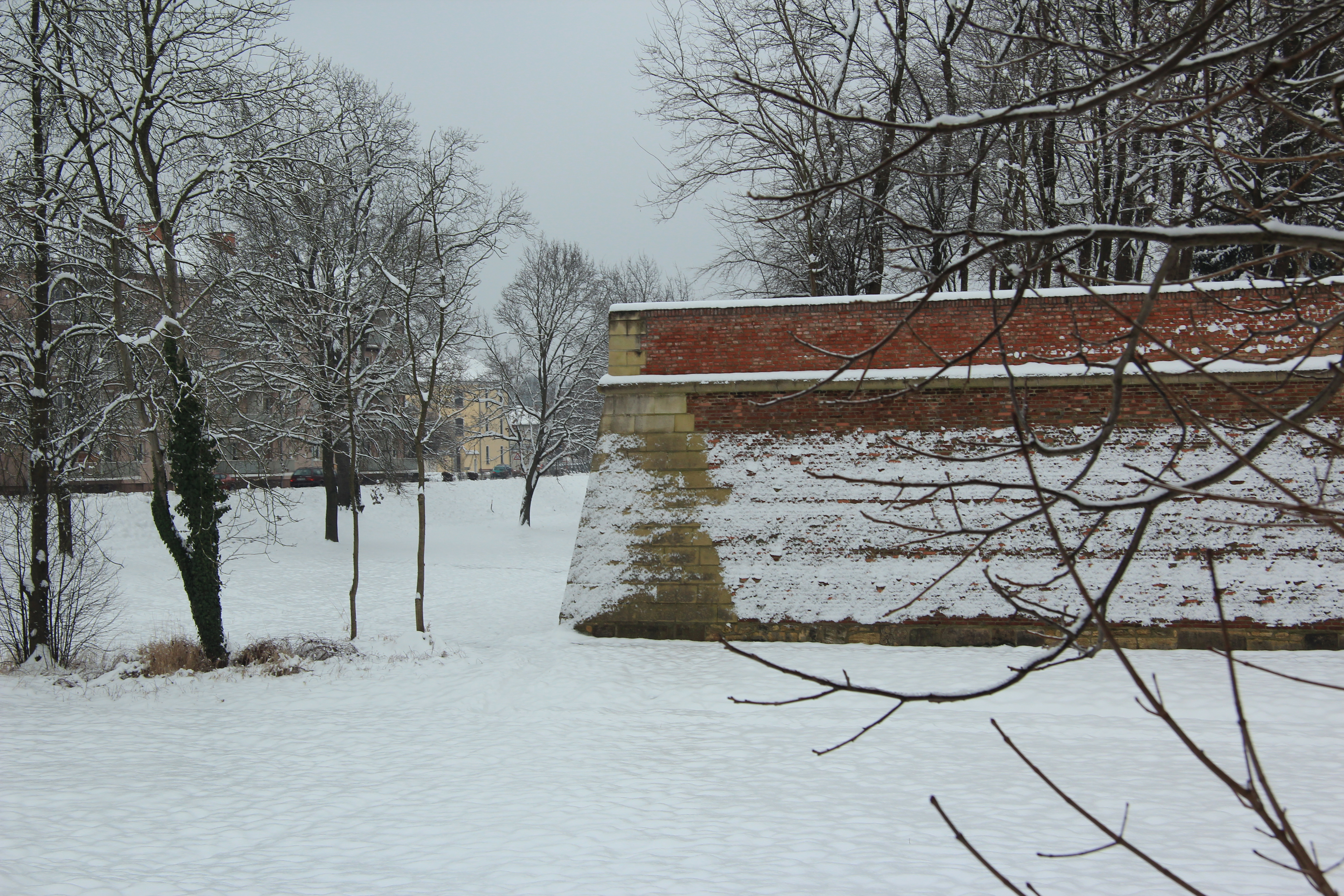
Bad Radkersburg-Stadtmauer
- Rottenmann. The original settlement, mentioned in 927, was two miles to the east. New town laid out in the 12th century. Probably granted a Charter by Duke Rudolf I in 1280. Walls constructed in the 13th century with five gate towers. Today only the south gate survives with long lengths of wall to the southeast and SW, together with evidence for a moat.
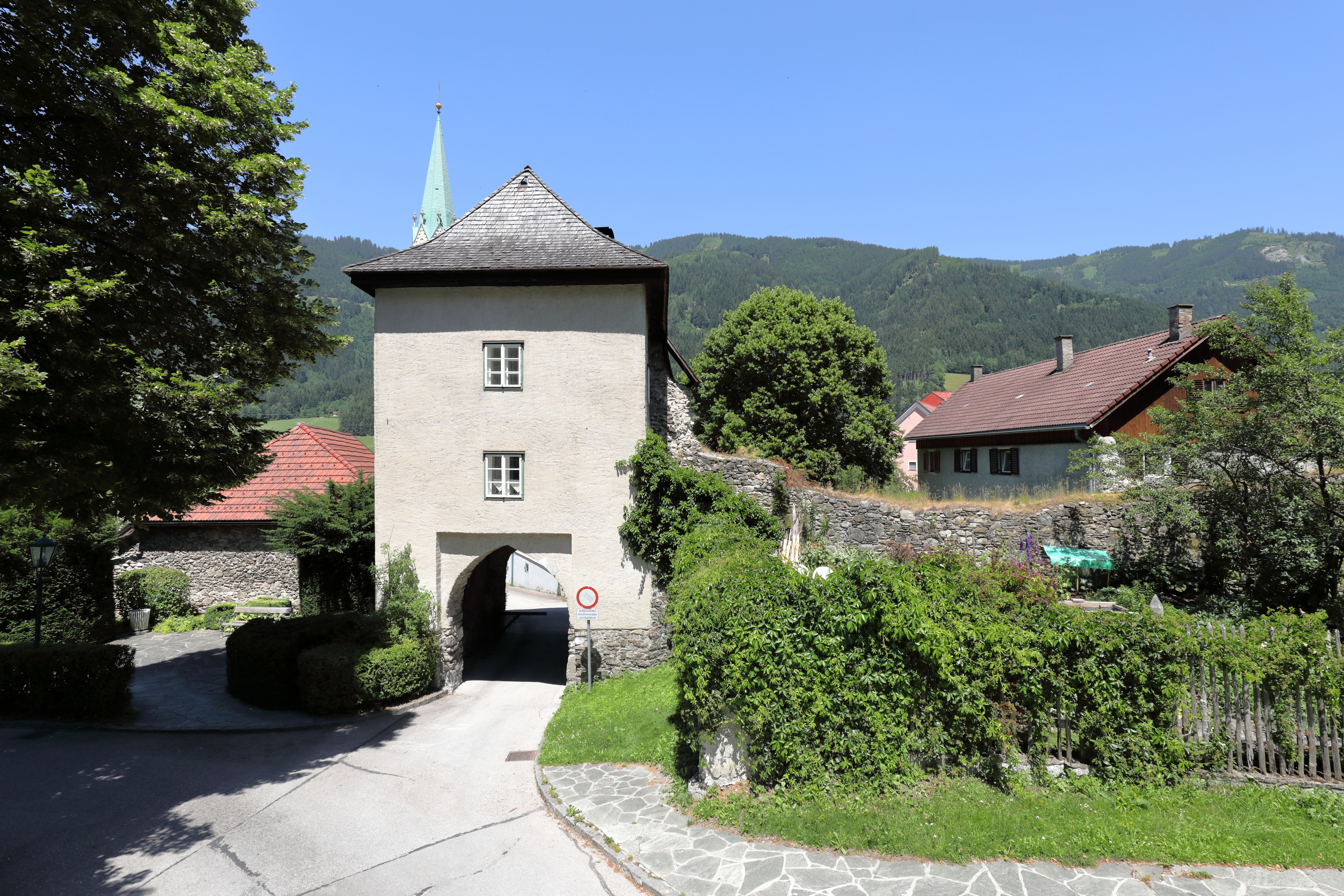
Rottenmann Altes Burgtor

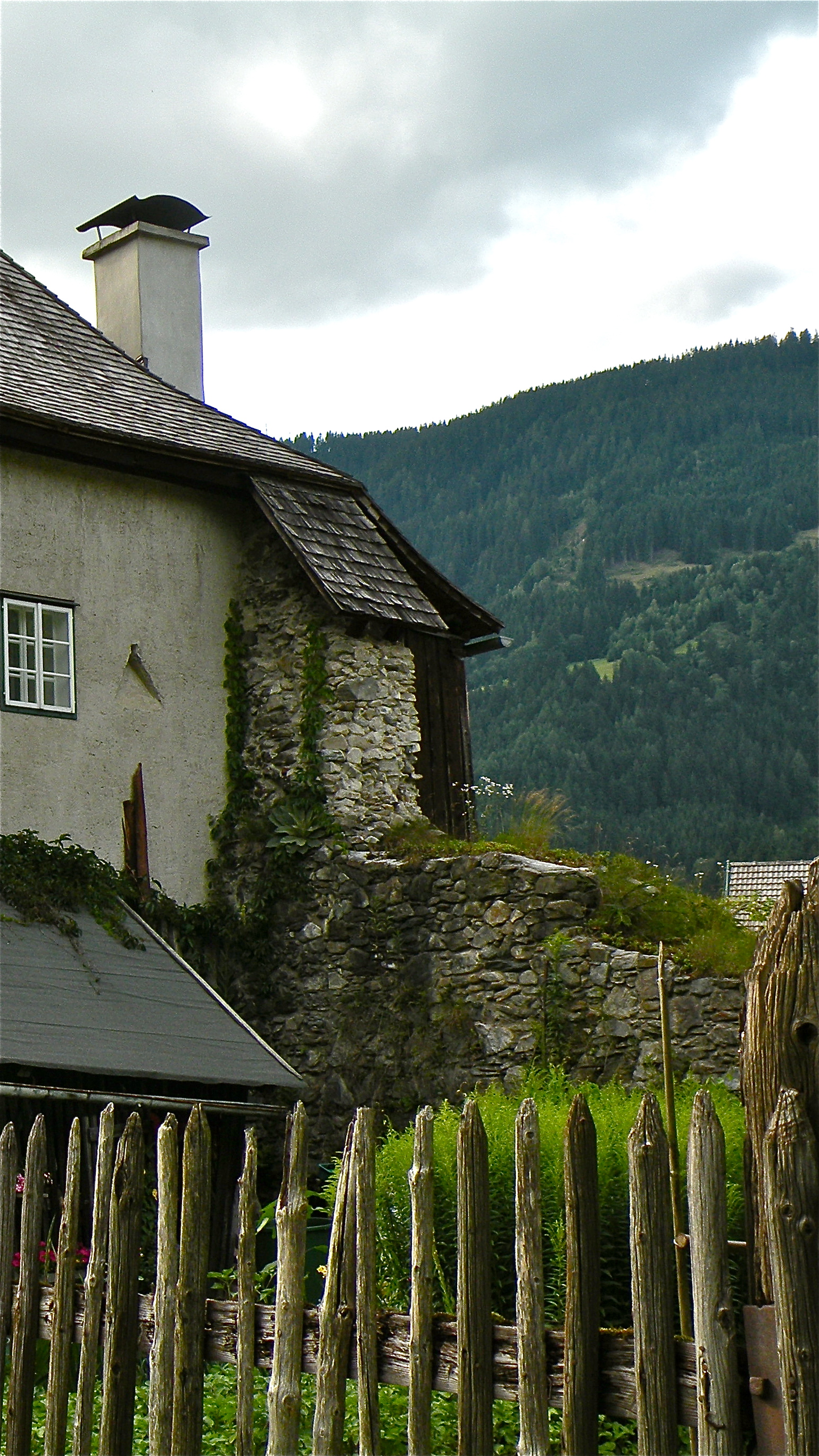
Rottenmann Mauterstück neben Burgtor

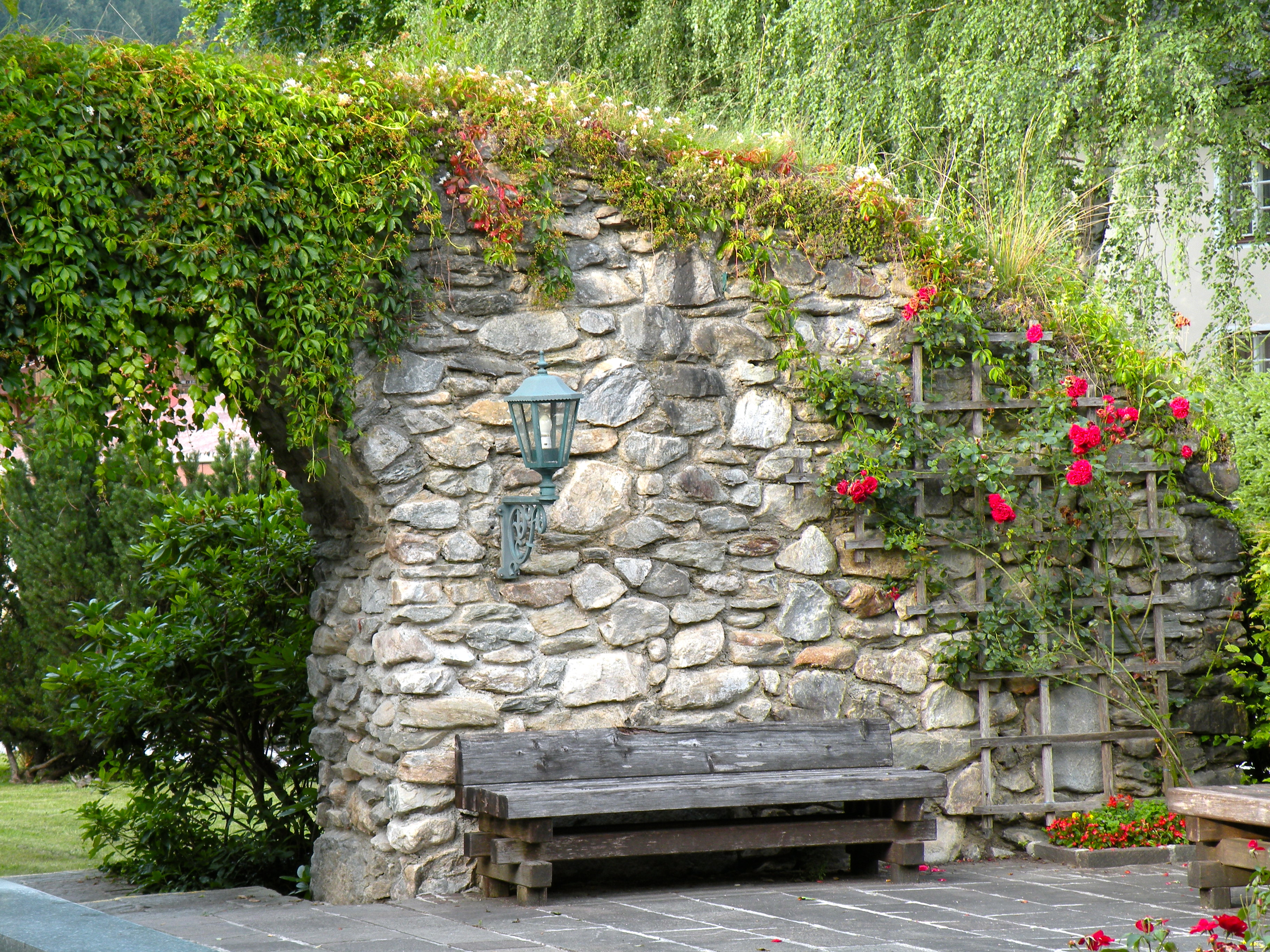
Rottenmann Stadtmauer
- Schladming, a mining town, was first mentioned in 1180 and a charter granted in 1322. Following the Farmers’ Uprising in the 1520s, Schladming's walls were partly levelled and the town deprived of its charter. However, the walls were re-instated in 1629. Now the west gateway ‘Salzburgertor’ and one of four towers remain.
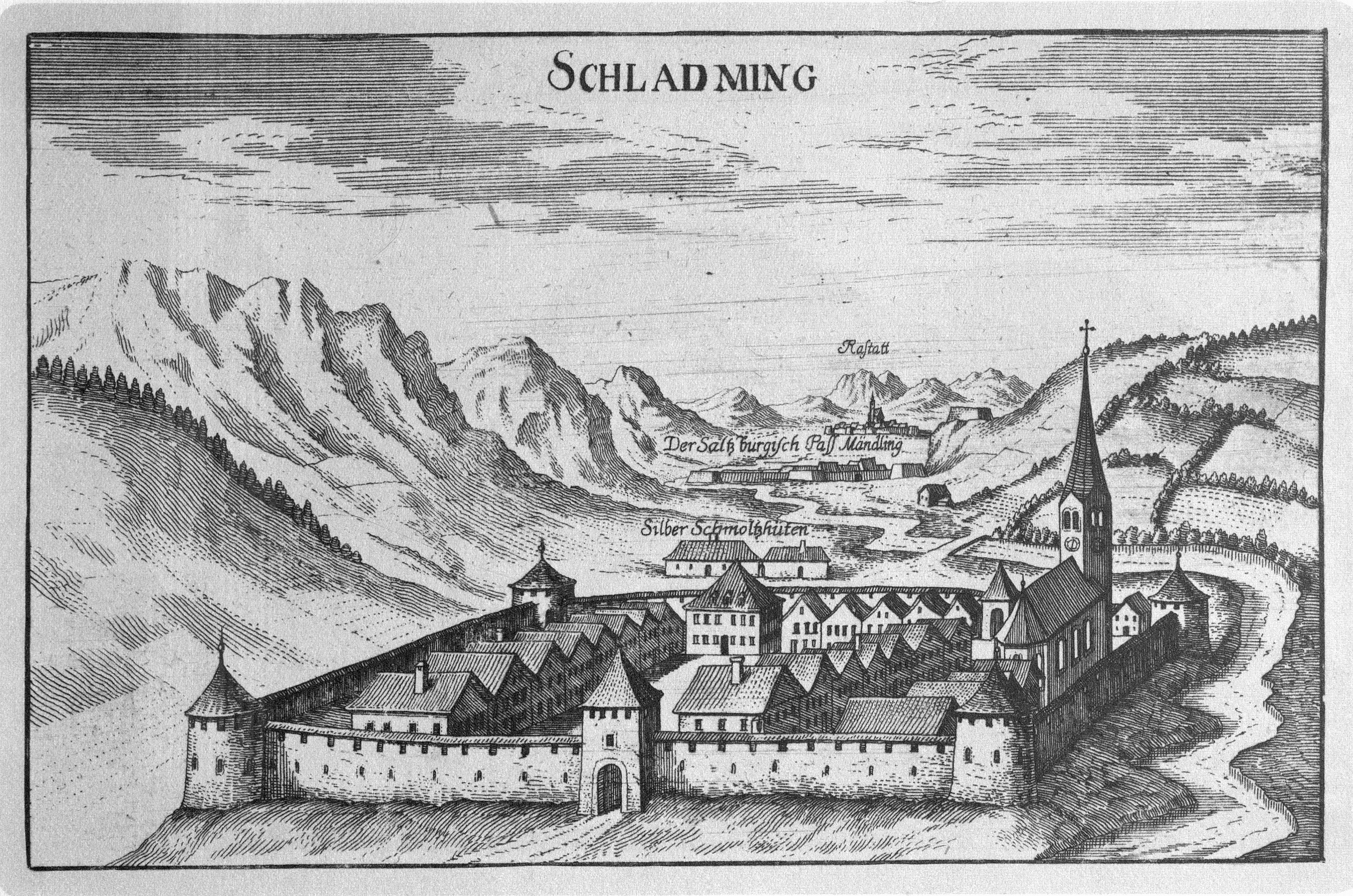
Vischer - Topographia Ducatus Stiriae Schladming

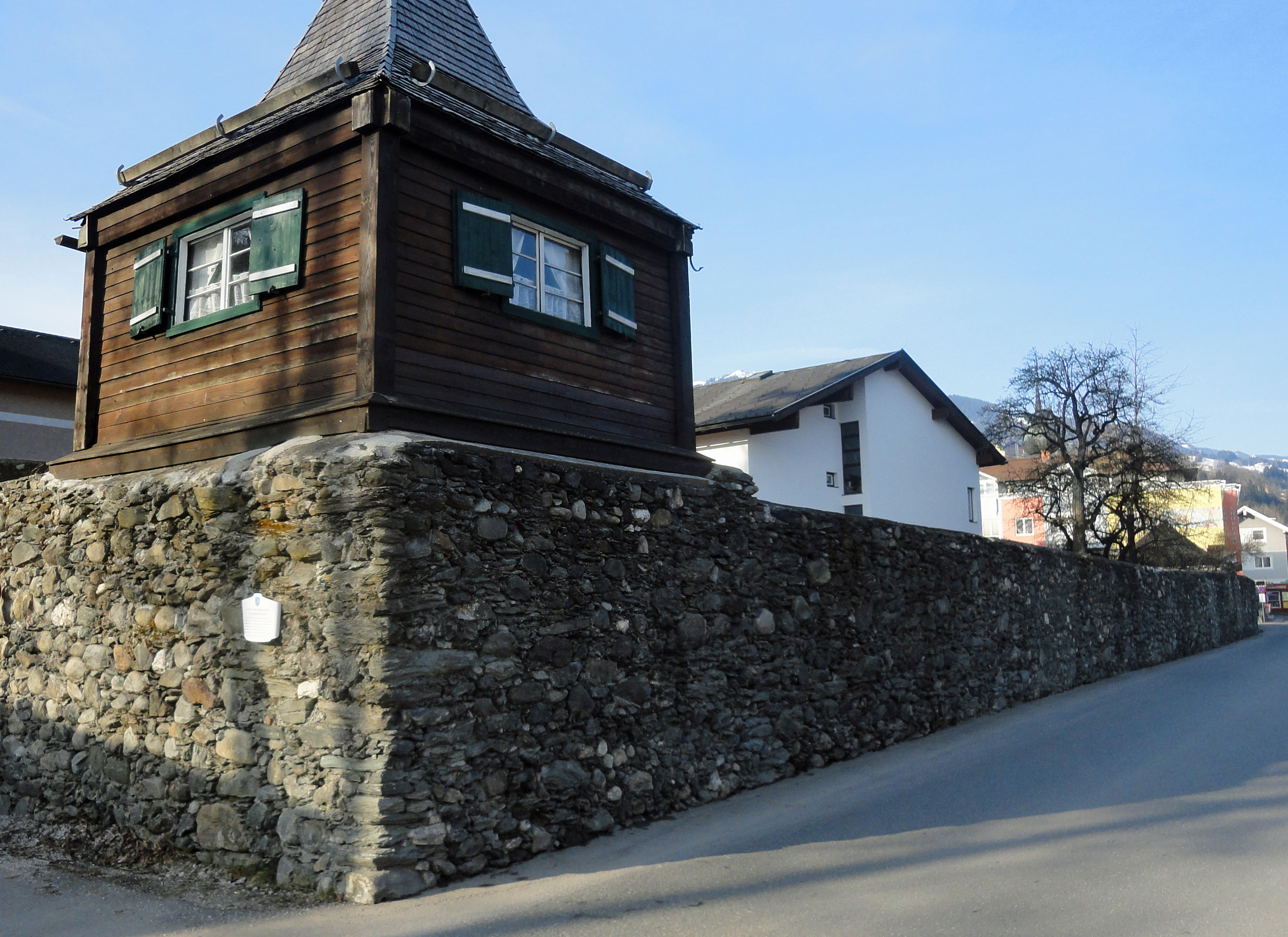
Stadtmauer Schladming mit Baderturm

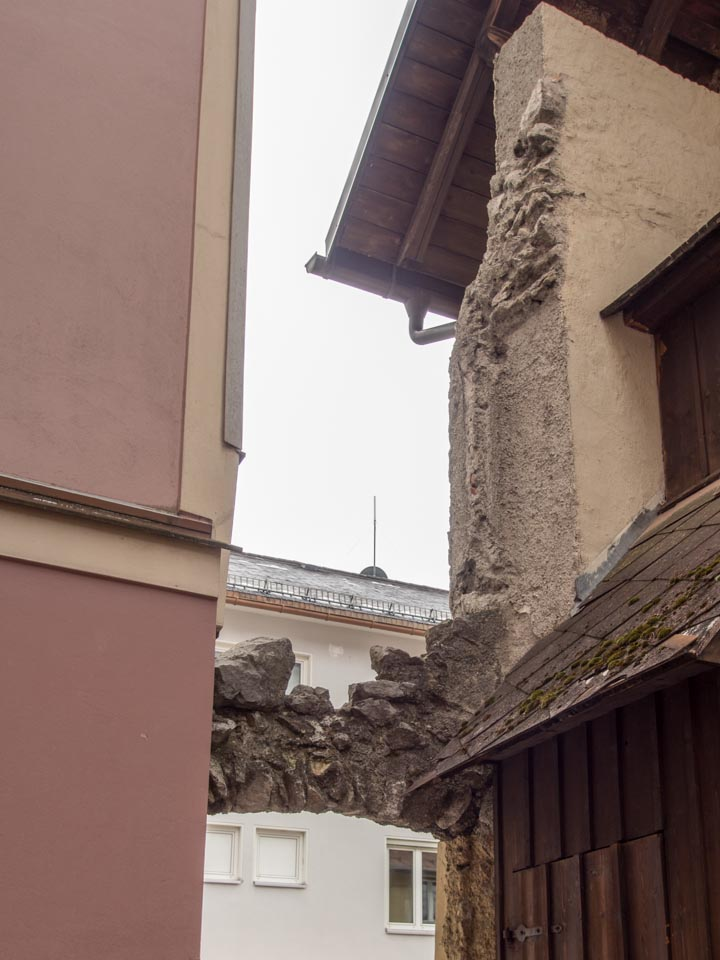
Stainach Stadtmauer

- Stainach
- Voitsberg is an almost rectangular planned town, probably laid out as a new town around 1200, with a long axial marketplace. The ruined castle of Obervoitsberg is to the north and is connected to the town with walls and rectangular towers. Little survives of the walls of the town itself, apart from a round tower at the southeast corner. Some evidence that there were moats on the east and west sides.
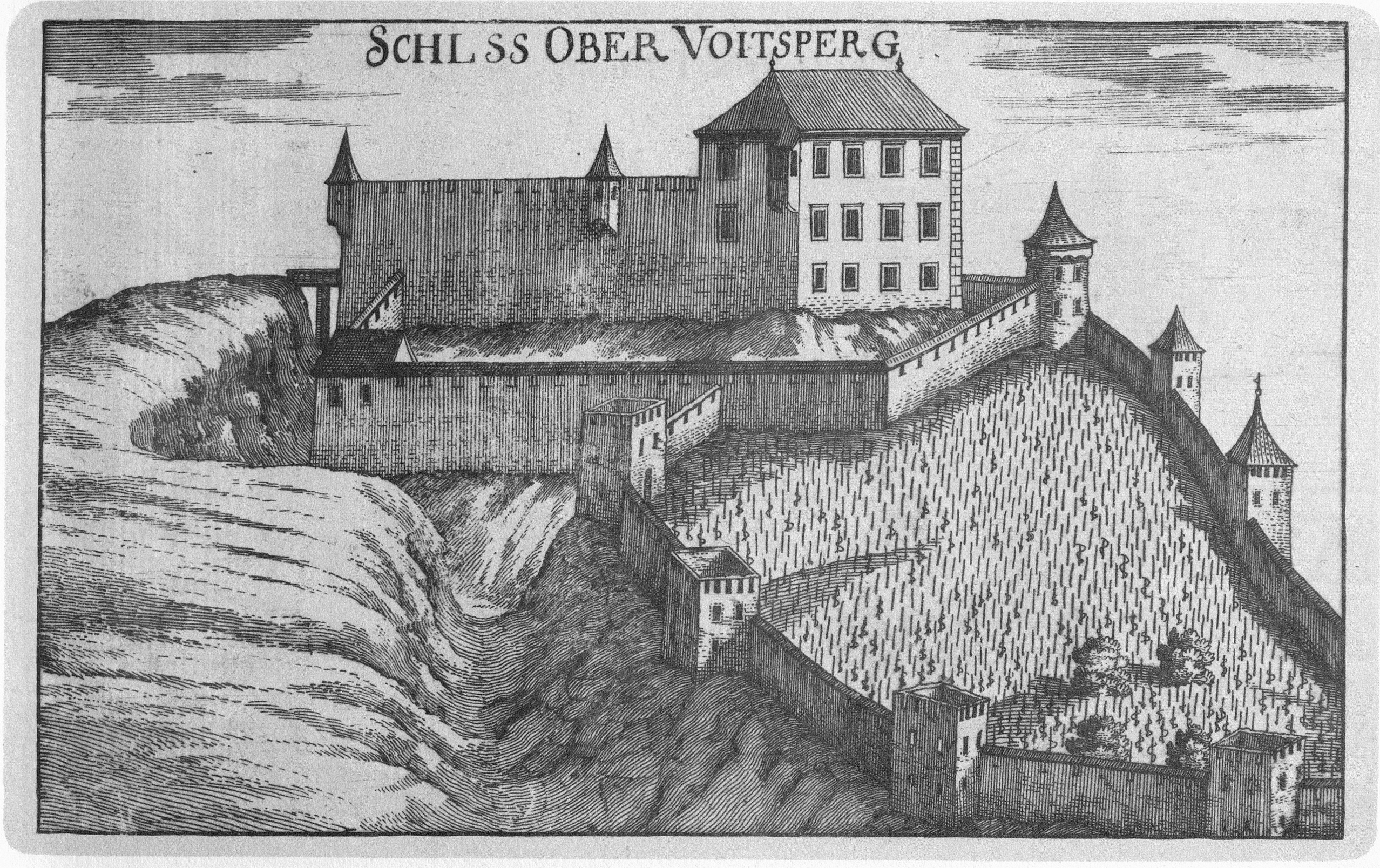
Burg obervoitsberg

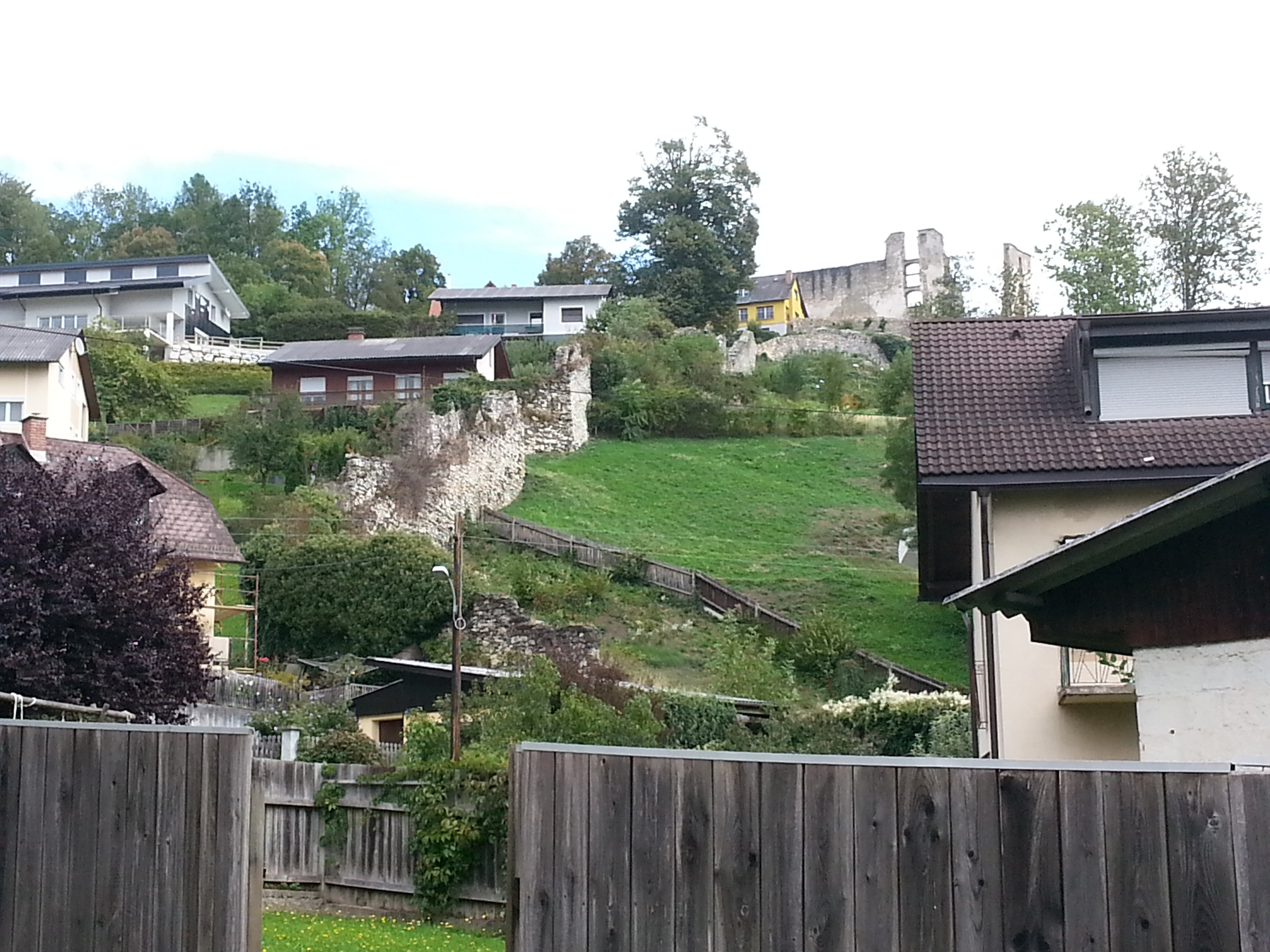
Burgruine Obervoitsberg Stadtmauer

=== Tyrol (Tirol) ===
- Hall in Tirol. The town is sited to north of the river Inn with the Burg Hasegg and the Munzertor between the town and the river. The original defended site appears to have been ovoid in shape. Merian (1679) shows a walled town with gates and towers and additional walls leading to a bridge over the Inn. Now only lengths of wall survive with a tower and ditch on the SE.
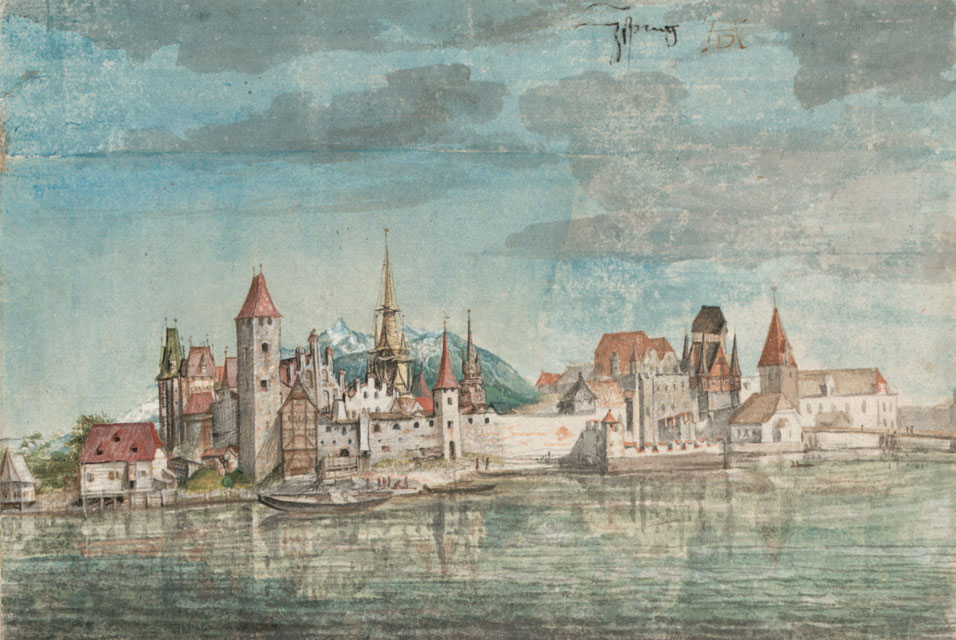
  View of Innsbruck from the North, c. 1496. Watercolour by Albrecht Dürer
- Innsbruck. Little remains of the medieval defences of Innsbruck. The ‘Altstadt’ was defended by a wall on five sides and a tall gate tower facing the bridge crossing the river Inn. Next to the tower was the Ottoburg, a late medieval palace, that still survives. The Karlsburg with the Kolberturm served as the southern gate. The large, almost rectangular, marketplace is built over, but is still faced by the ‘Altes Rathaus’ with the tall 14th century ‘Stadtturm’. A low secondary wall ran along the quayside on the NW. The defences are well shown in the ‘Schwazer Burgbuch’ watercolour of 1561 and in the Braun and Hogenberg print of 1630.
- Kitzbuhel consists of two sites: the older Burg on a hill, now occupied by the parish church and Liebfrauen church. This was probably the ‘Chizbuhel’ mentioned around 1165. To the south of this was the walled town, probably the ‘Nueue Seidlung’ or new settlement mentioned in 1271 and granted a charter by King Louis of Bavaria in 1336. This walled town, of which only the south gate-tower - the Jochentor now survives, had two parallel marketplaces. Aerial views indicate that the walled enclosure was moated. Kitzbuhel and Kufstein were both conquered by the Habsburg Emperor Maximilian I in 1504, but unlike at Kufstein, Maximilian does not appear to have re-fortified Kitzbuhel.
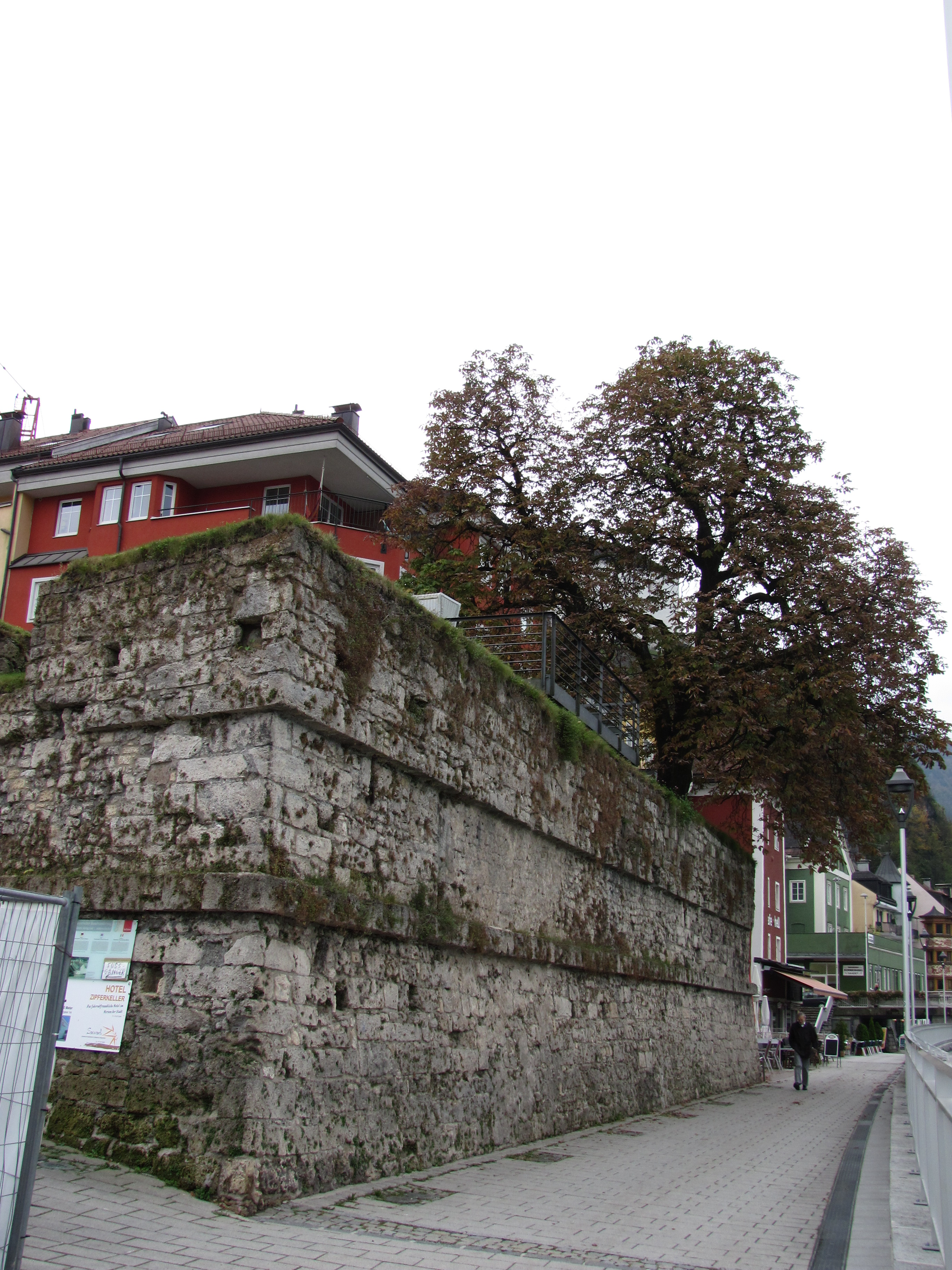
  Kufstein Wasserbastei
- Kufstein. A market was granted in 1393 and Kufstein was given a charter in 1393. The town is over shadowed by the castle. Originally a possession of the Dukes of Bavaria, it was taken by the Habsburg Emperor Maximilian I in 1504, who proceeded to re-fortify both the town and the castle. This process continued under Ferdinand I between 1552 and 1562, around 1675, and then from 1730 to 1759 by the architects J H Gumpp the Older and Younger. The result is that it is not possible to clearly recognise the medieval fortifications, but Merian print of 1649/1679 shows that a wide rampart had been built on the north side of the town. A watercolour of the siege of Kustein appears to show that the houses along the waterfront were fortified and there was a circular tower below the castle. There was a gate tower on the west facing the river Inn and on the other side of the bridge over the Inn a trace bastioned bridgehead had been built.
- Lienz lies between the rivers Isel and Drau and received its charter in 1242. Parts of the wall remain on the north fronting the Isel, with the Iselturm at the northwest corner and further fragments of the wall in the southwest and NE.
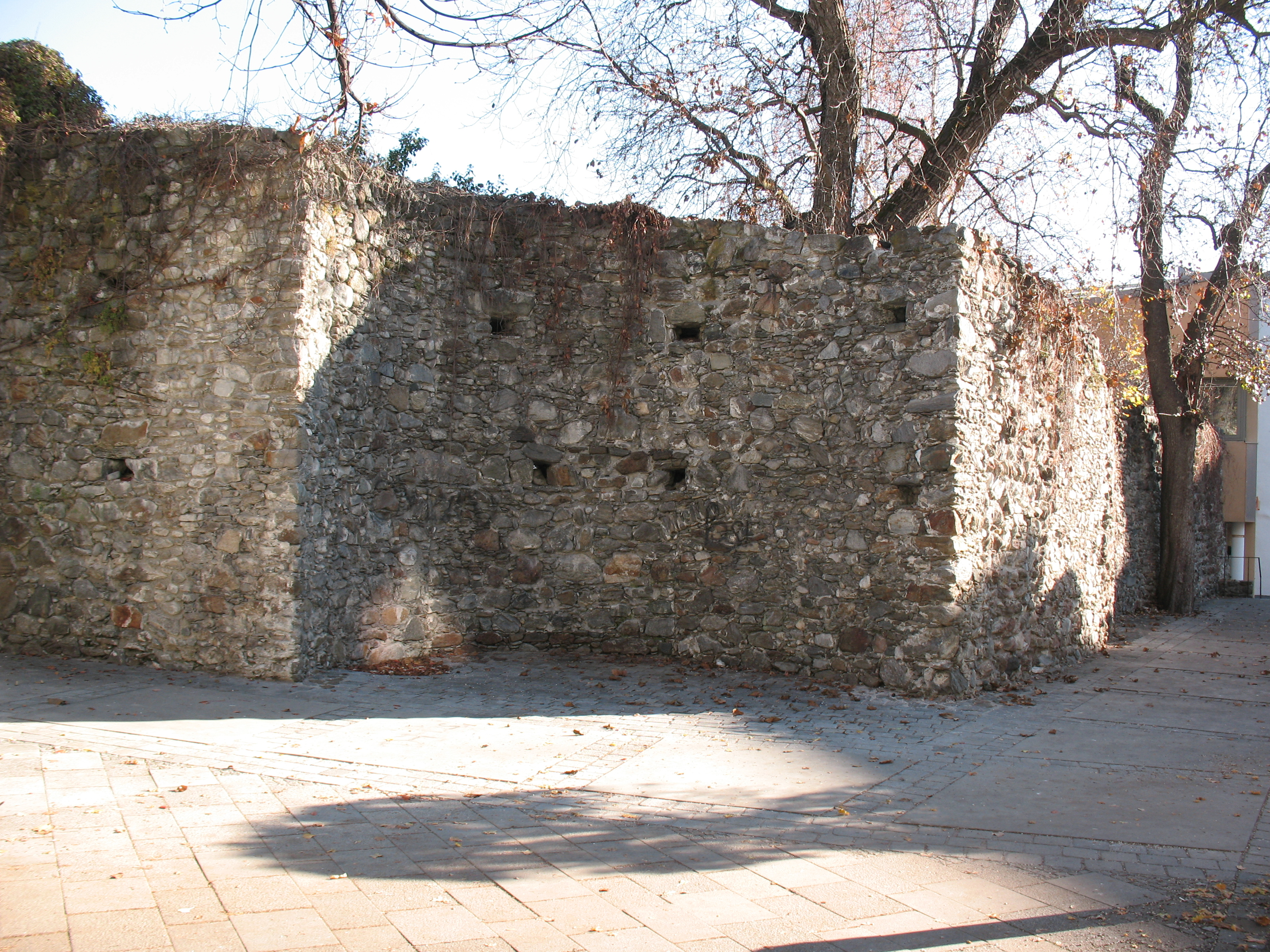
Lienz, Hofgarten, Teil der Stadtbefestigung

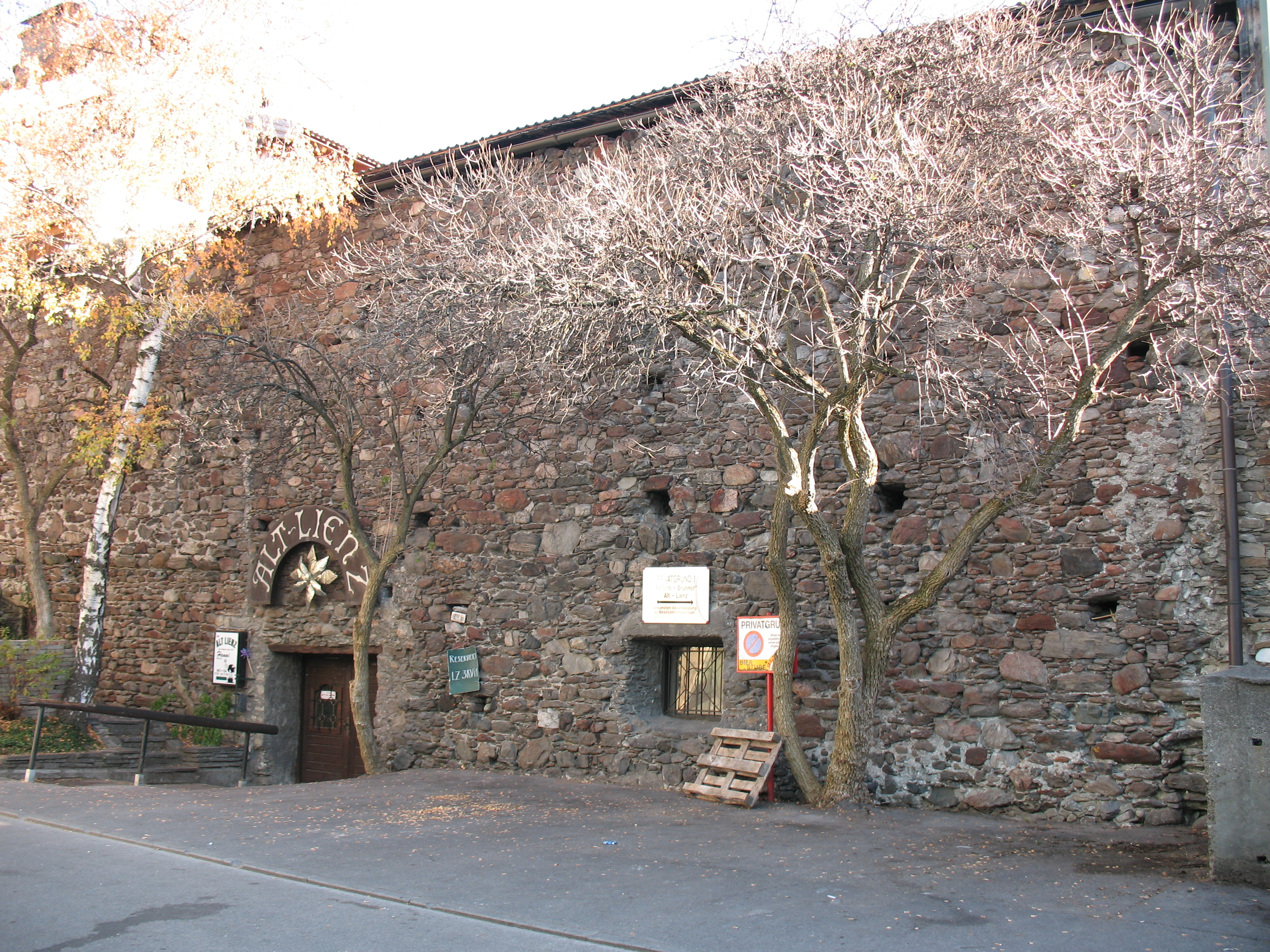
Lienz, Stadtmauer beim Alt Lienz

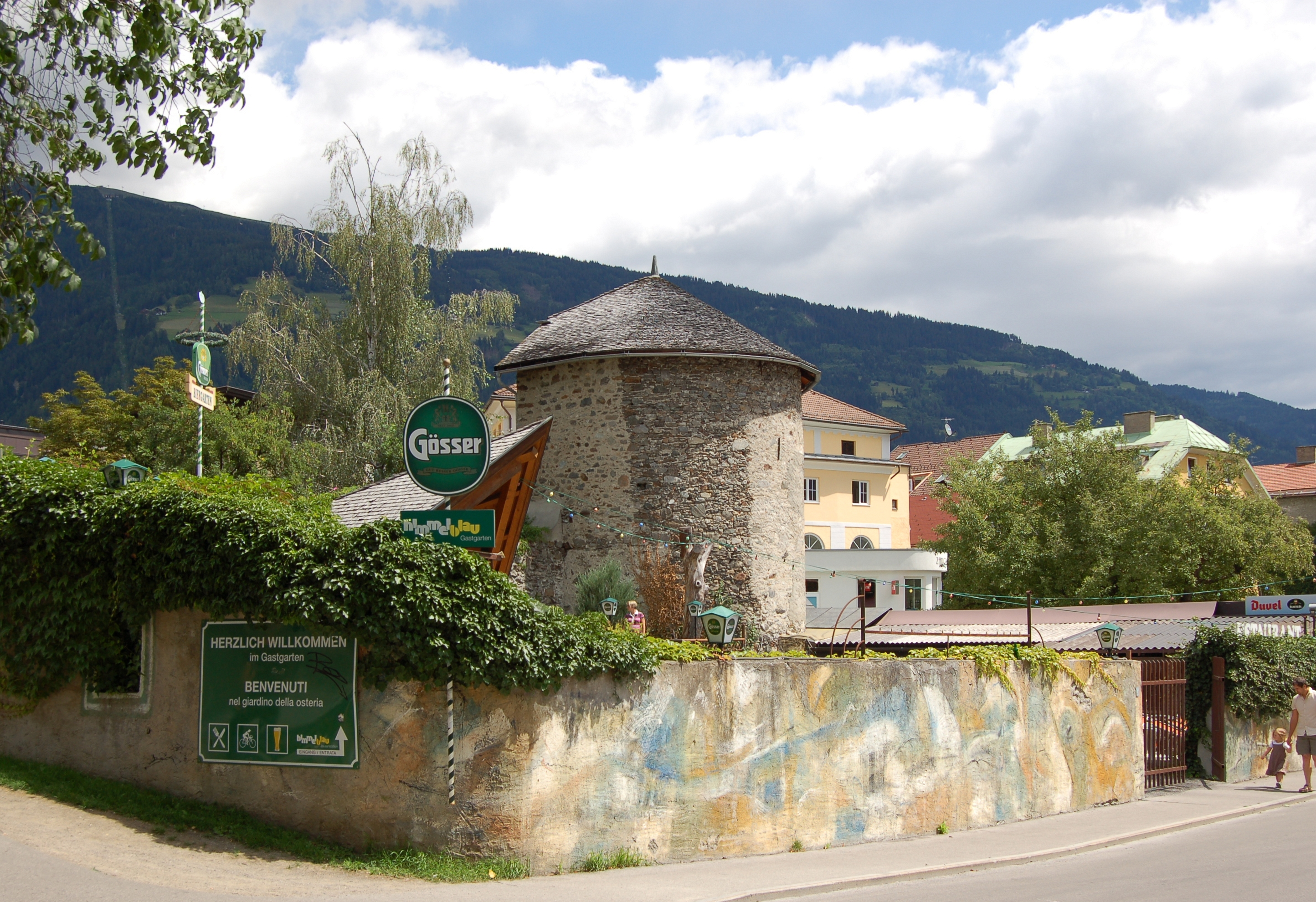
Stadtmauerturm Zwergengasse Lienz I, The Isel Tower at Lienz
- Radfeld
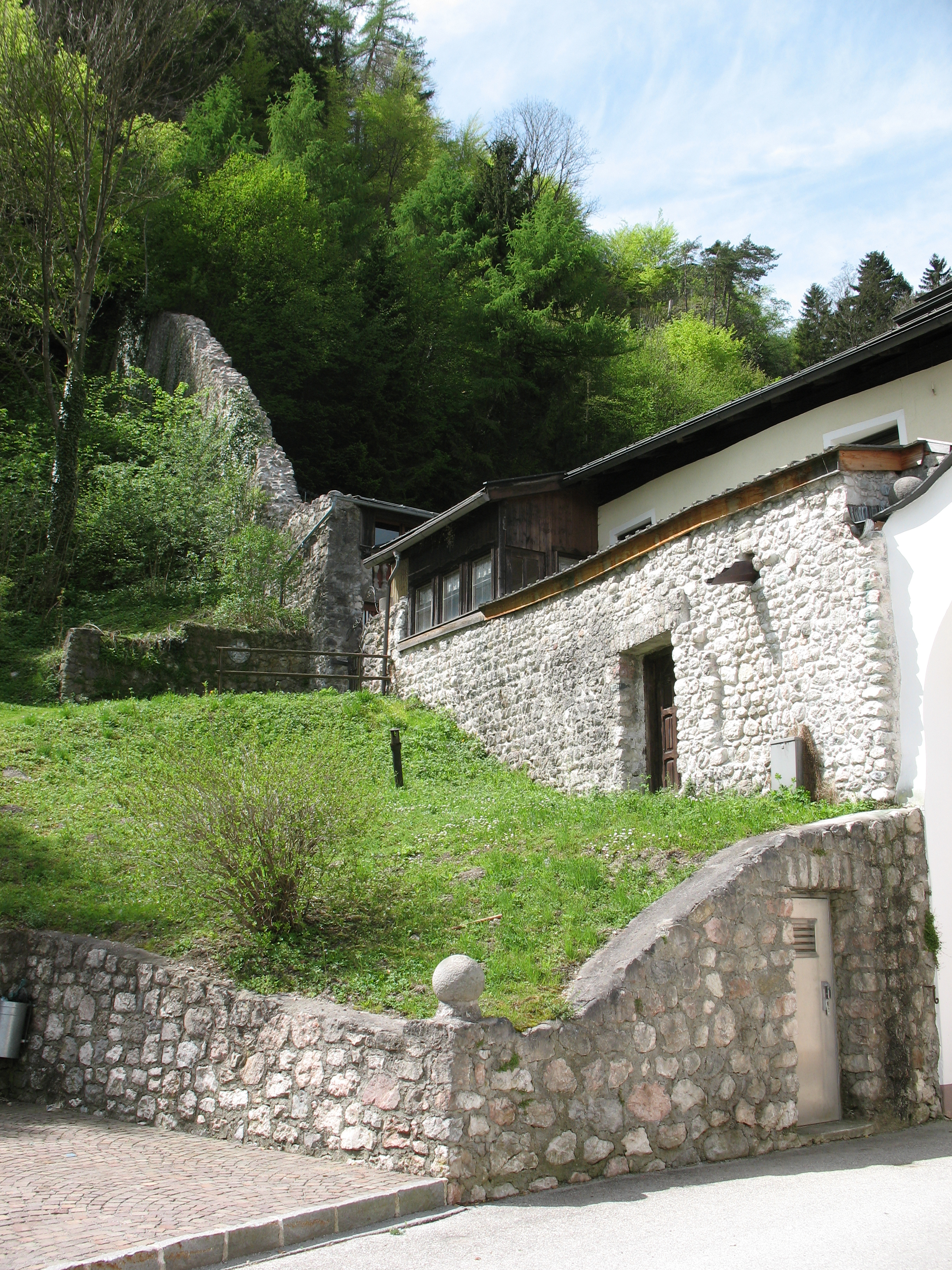
Radfeld, Reste der Stadtmauer

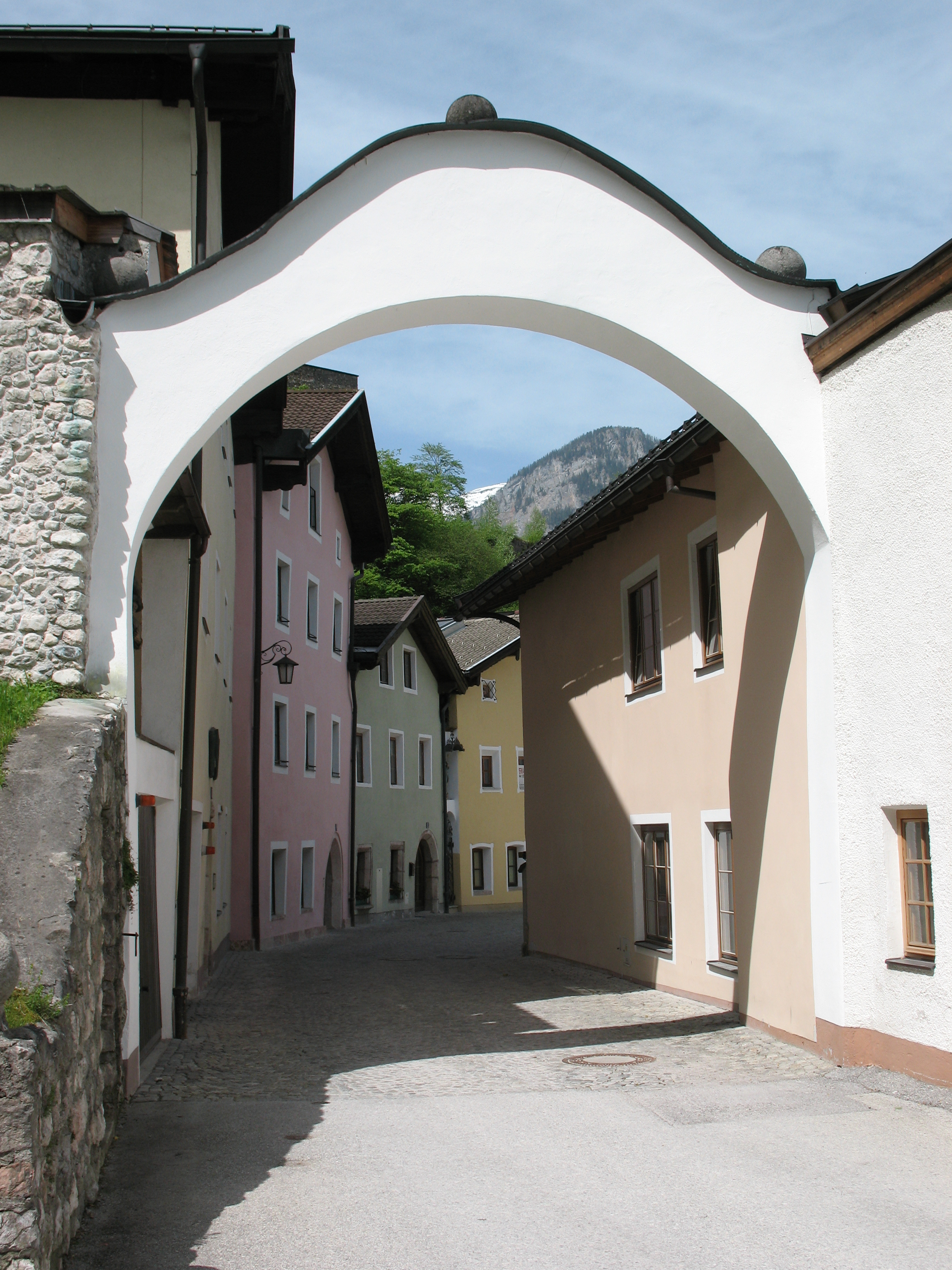
Radfeld, Kundler Tor
- Rattenberg is an almost triangular town sandwiched between the river Inn and the ruins of Rattennburg Castle. Granted a charter in 1393. Now little evidence of the walls. There was a moat on the northeast side.
- Vils was first mentioned in 1200 and given a charter by Ludvig of Bavaria. Now no evidence for the walls and gates that existed.

=== Upper Austria (Oberösterreich) ===
- Braunau am Inn. Originally an oval defended area similar to Schwanenstadt (ÖÖ), but in the early 14th century the southern part of the enclosure was transected by a straight wall and a ditch and to the north the town was laid out on a grid pattern. A long rectangular marketplace stretches between the site of the Wassertor (demolished 1892), which faced the river Inn, and the surviving Salzburger Tor in the south wall.
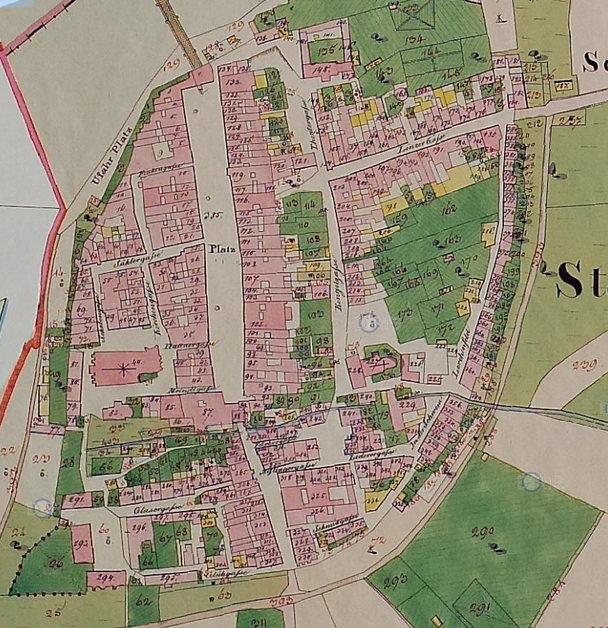
Braunau am Inn, Upper Austria. 'Franziszeische Landesaufnahme' 2nd Military Survey c1835

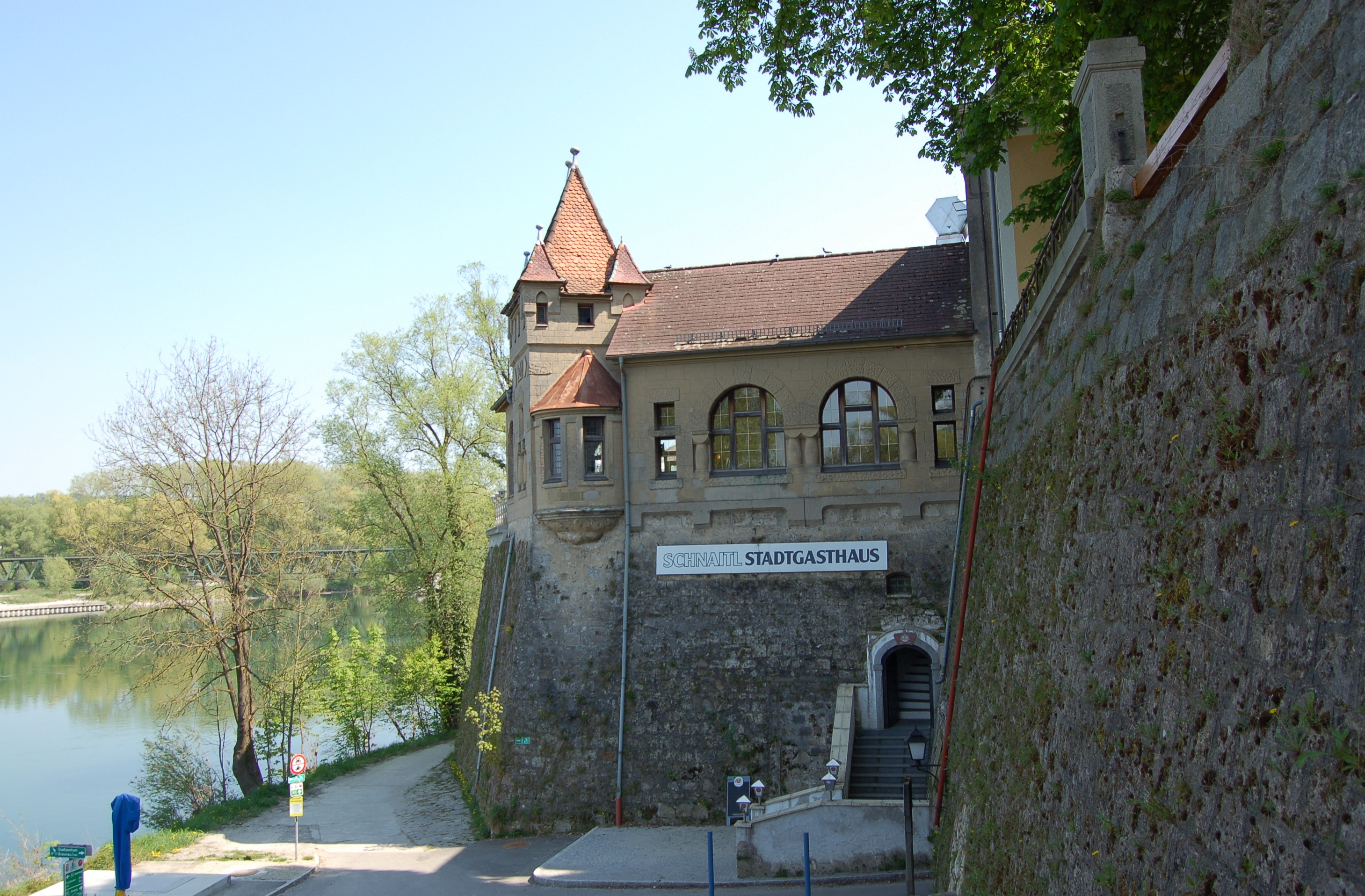
Stadtbefestigung Braunau am Inn, facing the river Inn Theatergasse

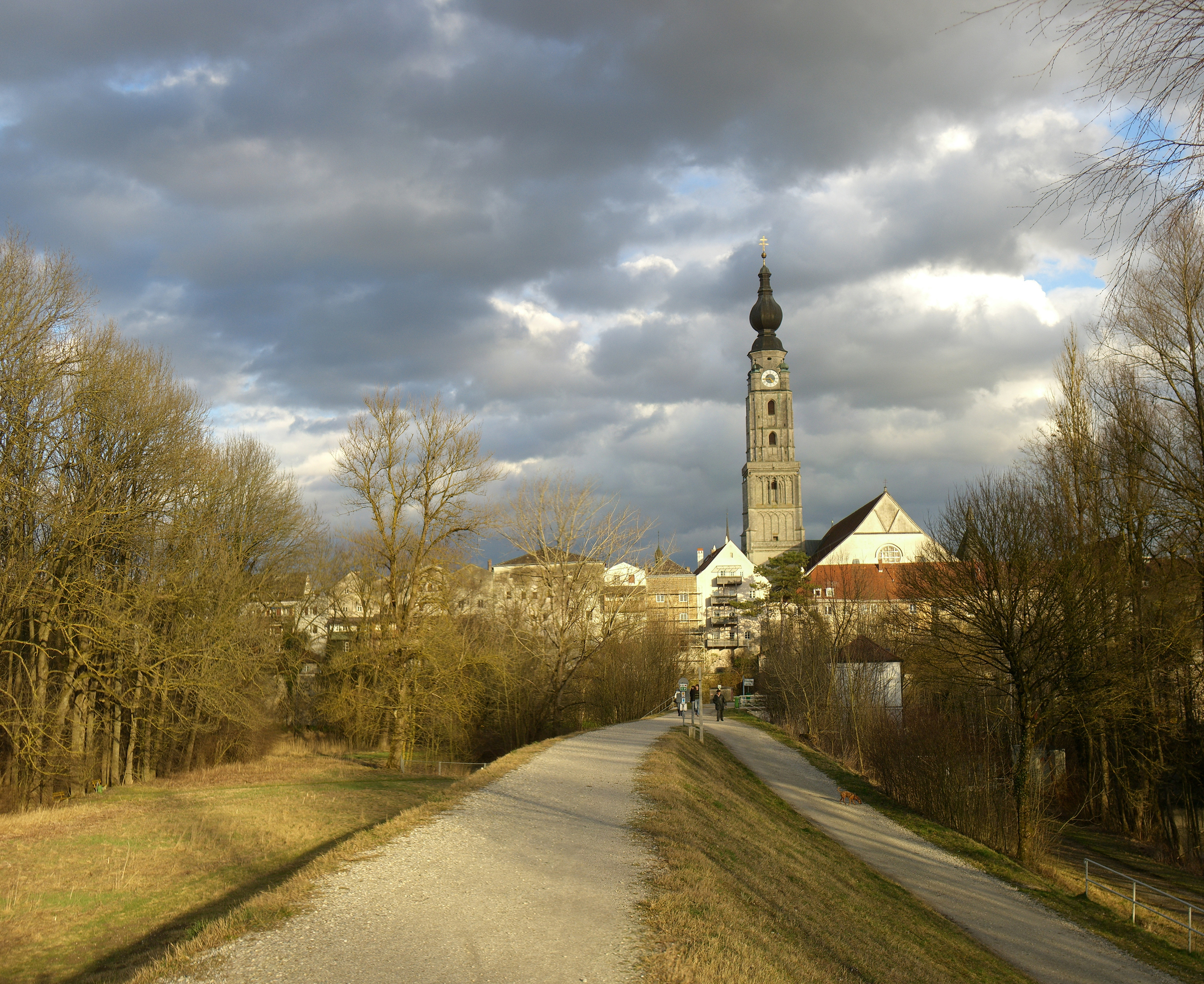
Braunau am Inn. View from flood dam (20th century) looking towards Braunau.
- Eferding was founded 1067 AD and gained its charter in 1222. This was the Roman Auxiliary Fort site of ‘Ad Mauros’ but there is no evidence as to how this fort relates to the existing remains of the walled town. Lengths of the wall survive but none of the gate towers. There was a double wall and ditch fortification to the east, and possibly a triple system to north of the castle, which was part of the defended enclosure.
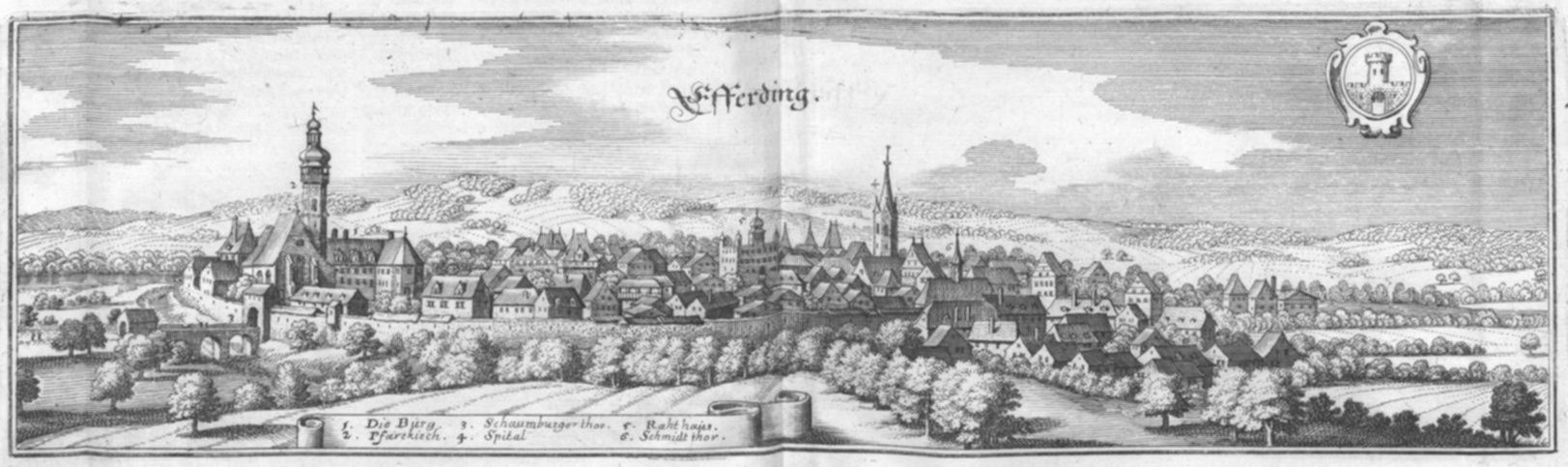
Statt Efferding (Merian)

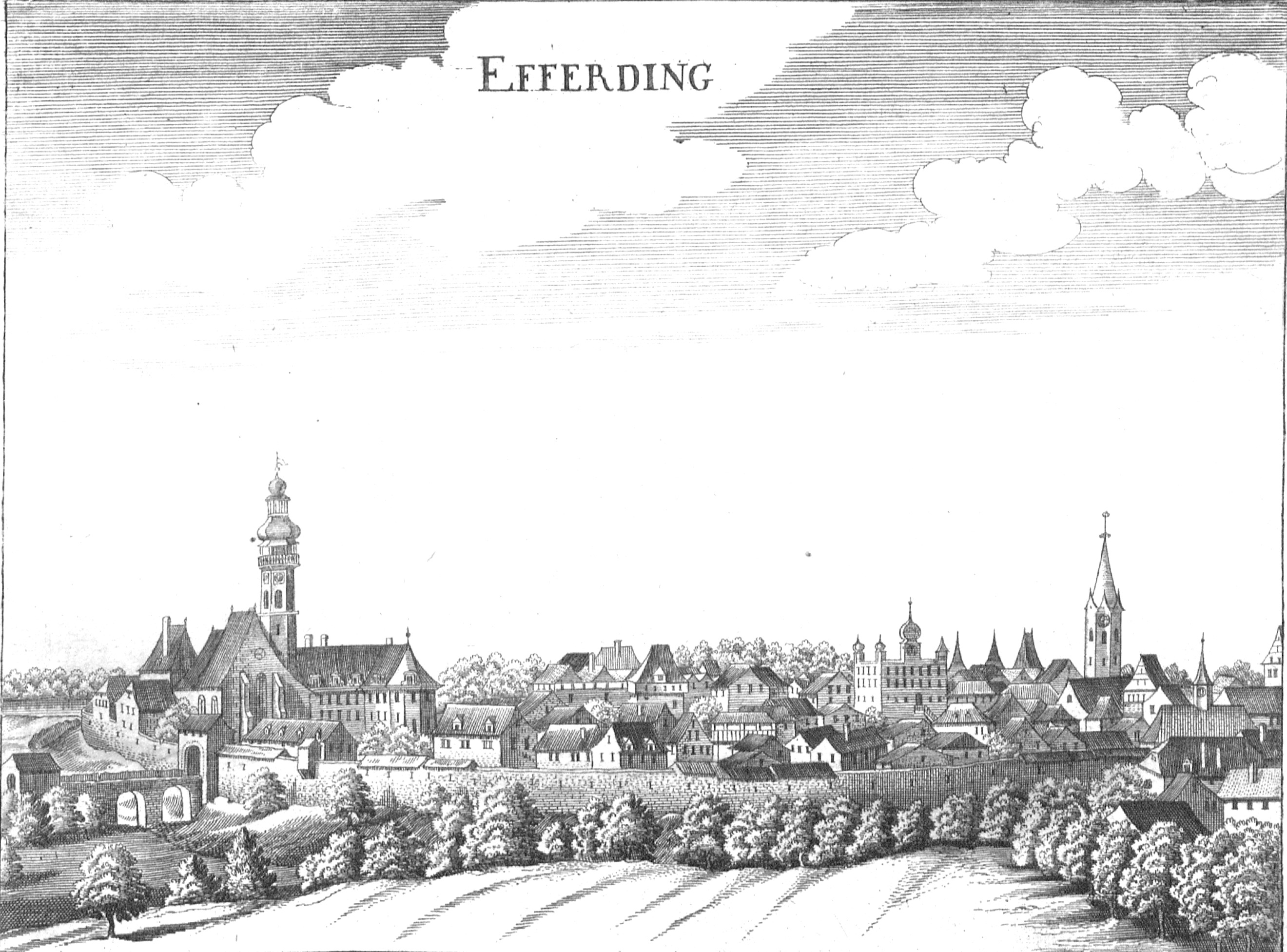
Eferding-Vischer 1672

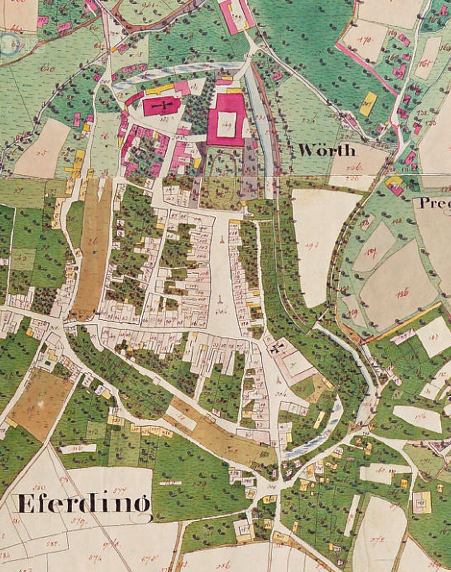
Eferding, Upper Austria. 'Franziszeische Landesaufnahme' 2nd Military Survey c1835
- Enns. The Ennsegg castle was founded on the Georgenburg around 900AD as a fortress against the Magyars. A market followed and when Enns passed in 1192 to the Habsburgs, a fortified town was laid out with a grid plan and a rectangular marketplace. A charter was granted in 1212 by Leopold VI. The walls largely survive with the Frauenturm by the north gate, the Judenturm on the NW, the Backerturm and Pfaffenturm on the southwest and the Ledererturm near the southeast corner. The gate towers have disappeared -demolished 1844-6- apart from the former Linzertores, which now forms part of the Torwarterhaus on the west. The Vischer print of 1672 shows that on the northwest and west there was a secondary wall with separate gates, but this wall has now largely disappeared.
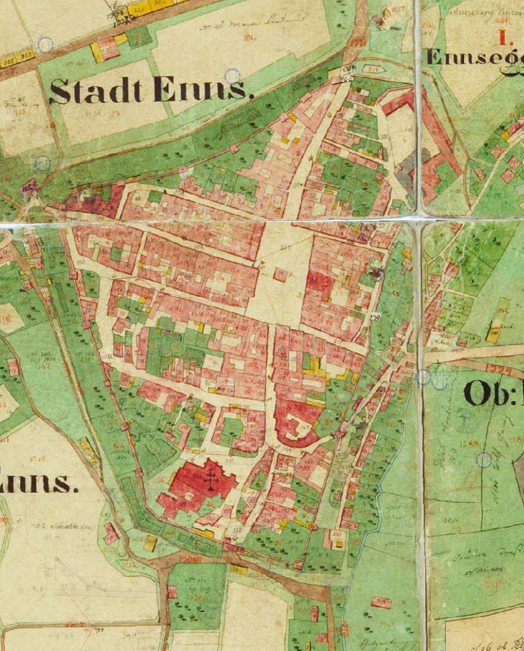
Enns, Upper Austria. Franziszeische Landesaufnahme 2nd Military Survey c. 1835

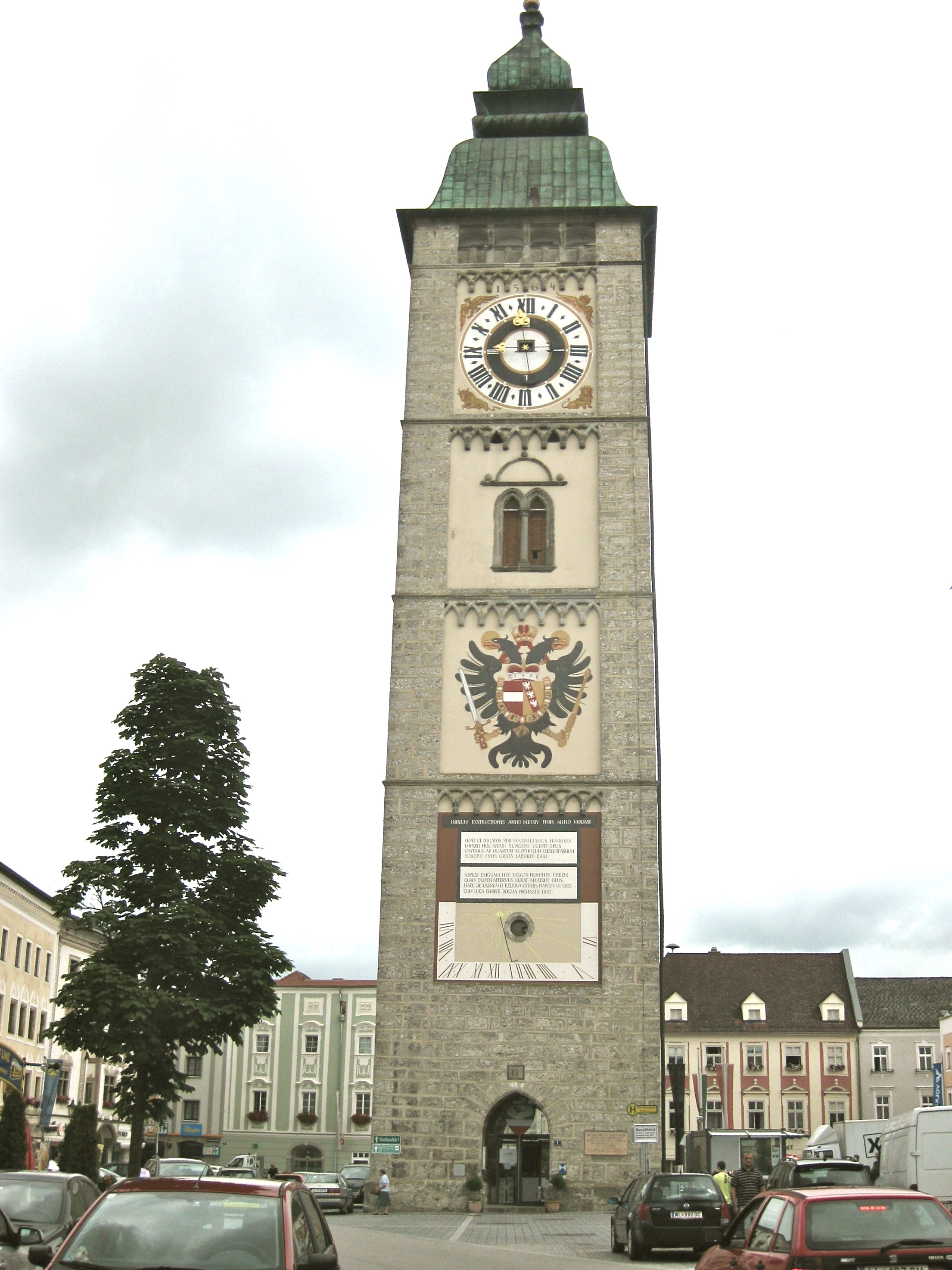
Enns Stadtturme

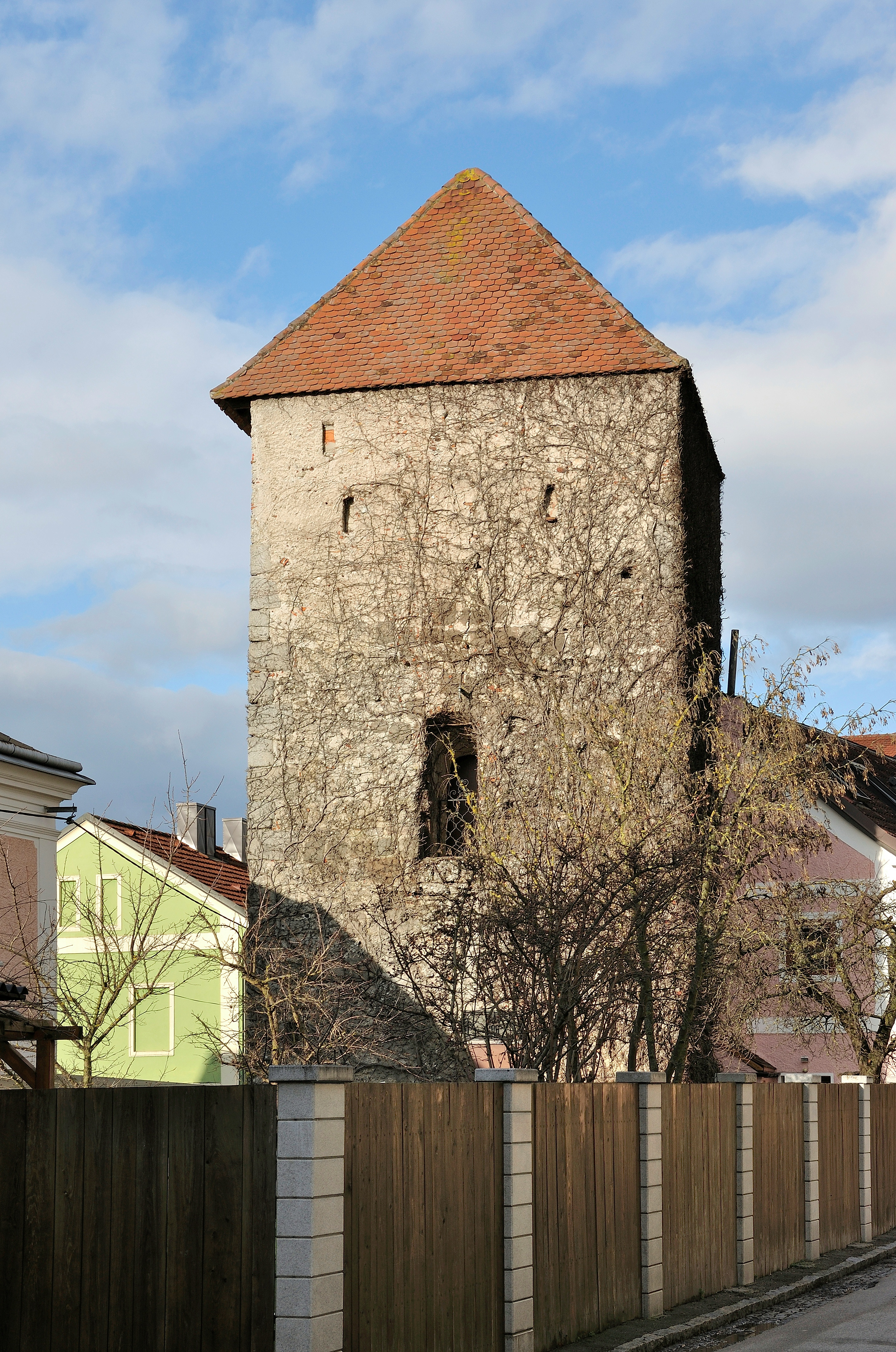
Enns Pfarrgasse, Pfaffenturm

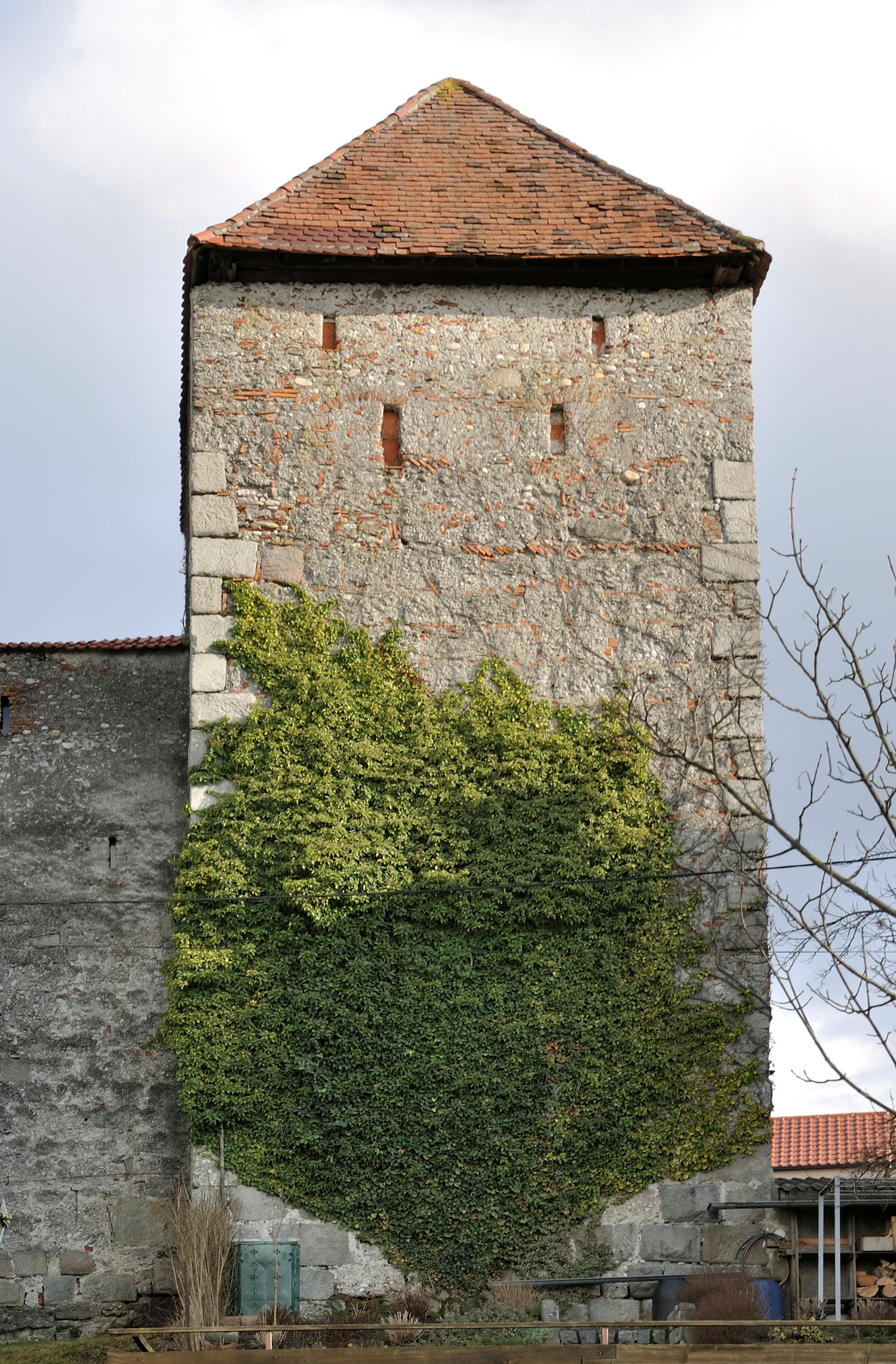
Enns Pfaffenturm

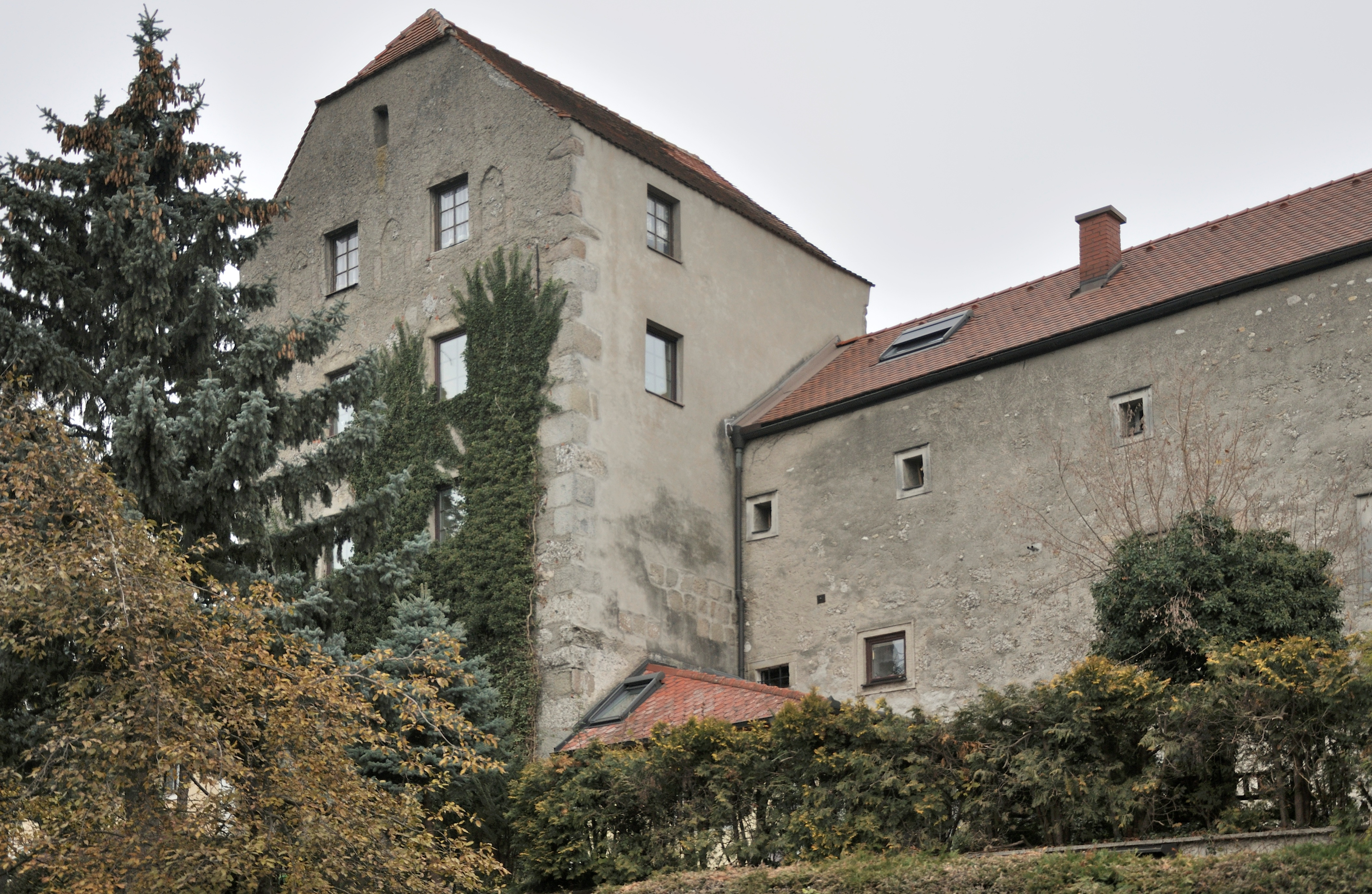
Enns Bräuergasse, Gürtlerturm

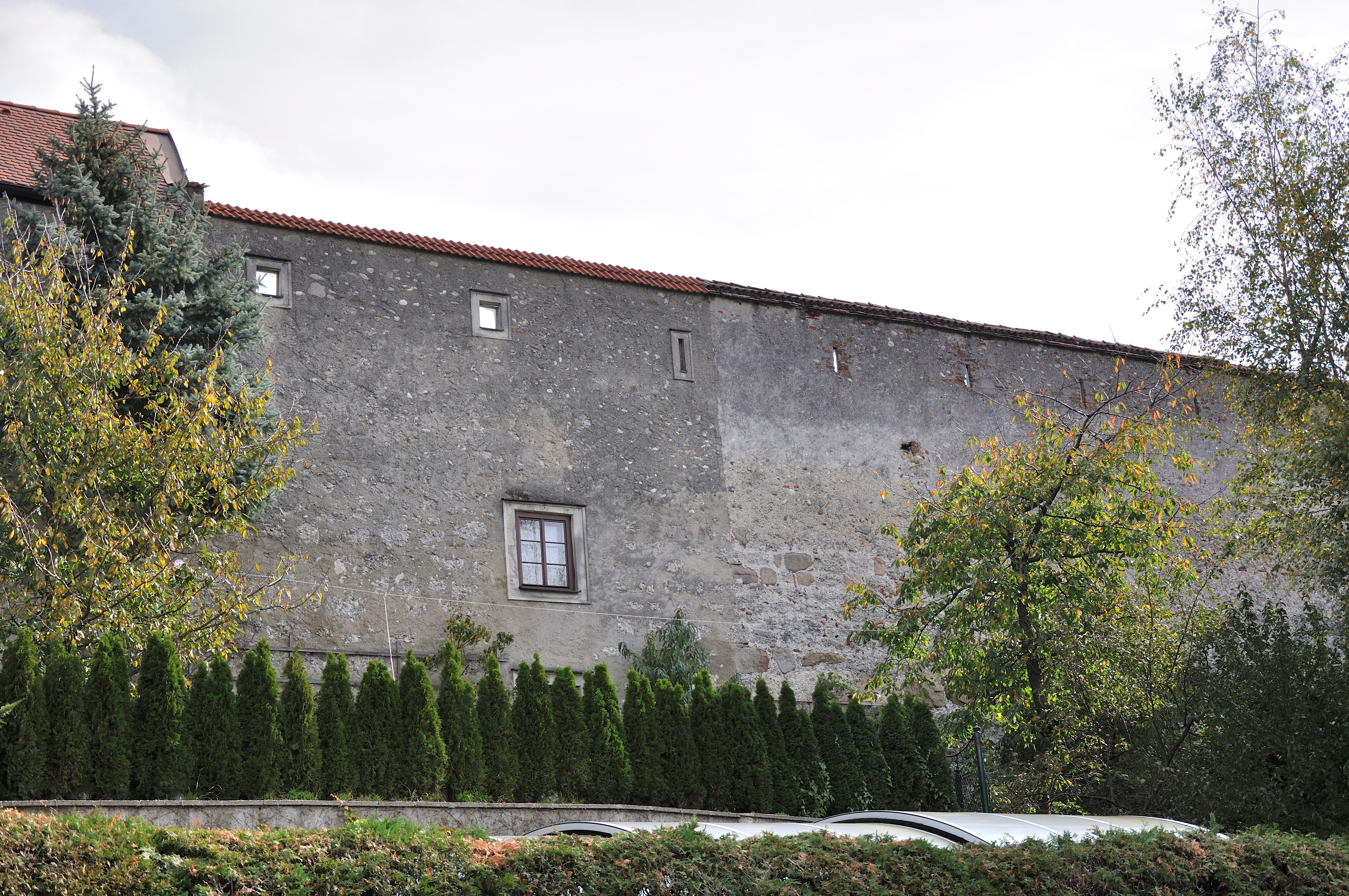
Enns Stadtmauerteil

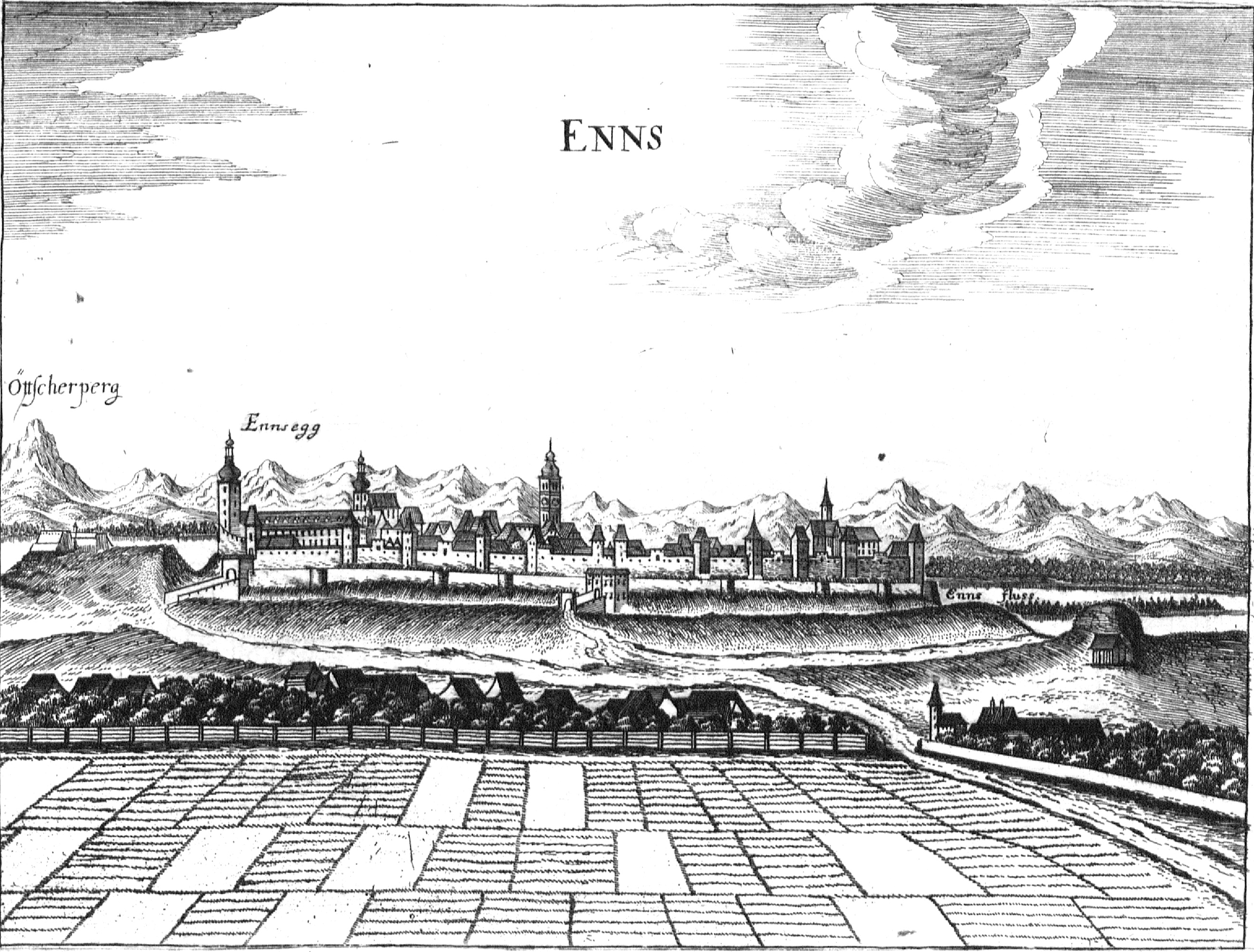
Enns Vischer 1672
- Freistadt. An almost four-sided fortified town with a large rectangular marketplace. Outside the main wall there is a secondary wall or ‘mantelmauern’. It is one of the best-preserved walled towns in Austria. Founded in 1241. There are two gate towers, the Bohmertor (N) and the Linzer Tor (S) and round-towers at the corners (Scheiblingturm, Heimatbundturm, and Pfefferbuchsturm with the castle at the northeast corner. There is also a fortified mill.
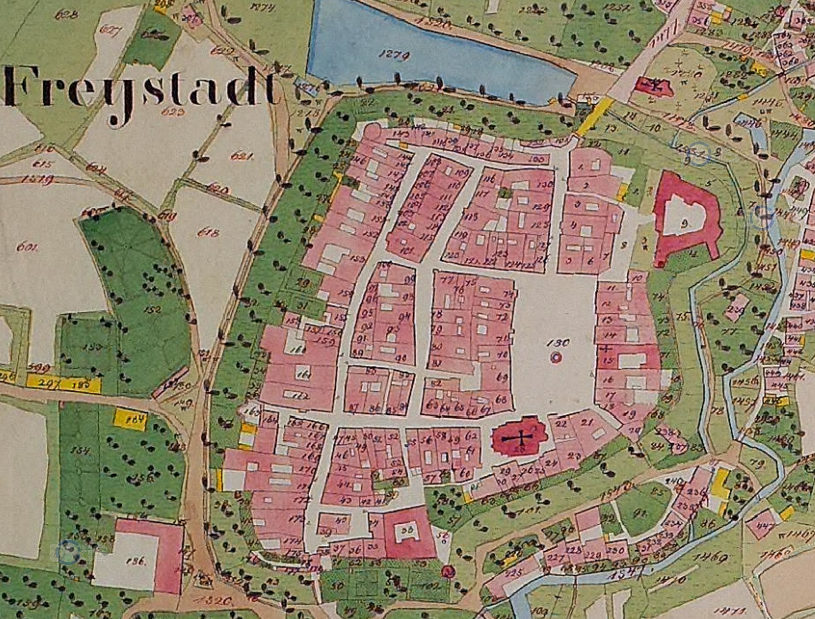
Freistadt, Upper Austria. 'Franziszeische Landesaufnahme' 2nd Military Survey c. 1835

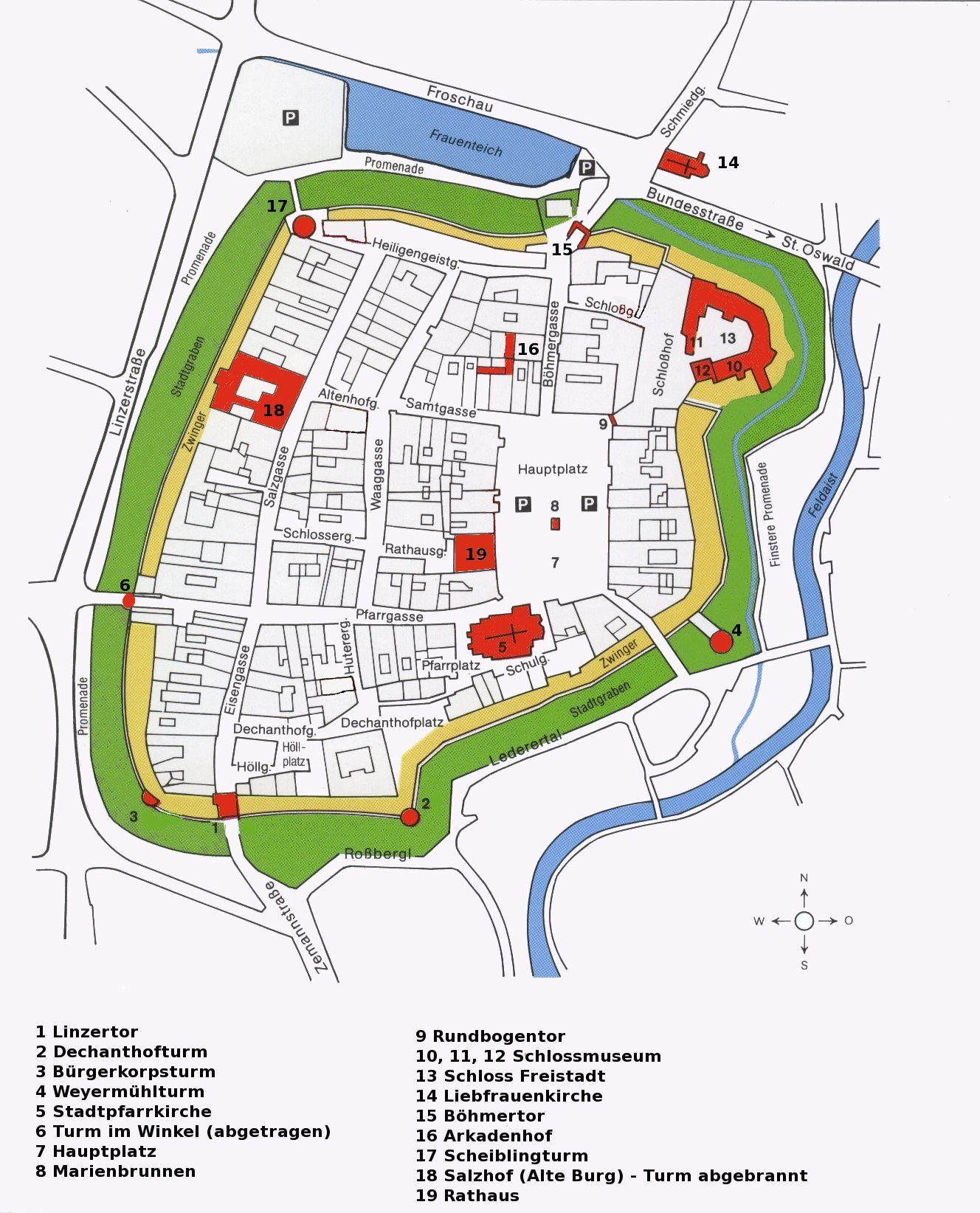
Stadtplan Freistadt Altstadt

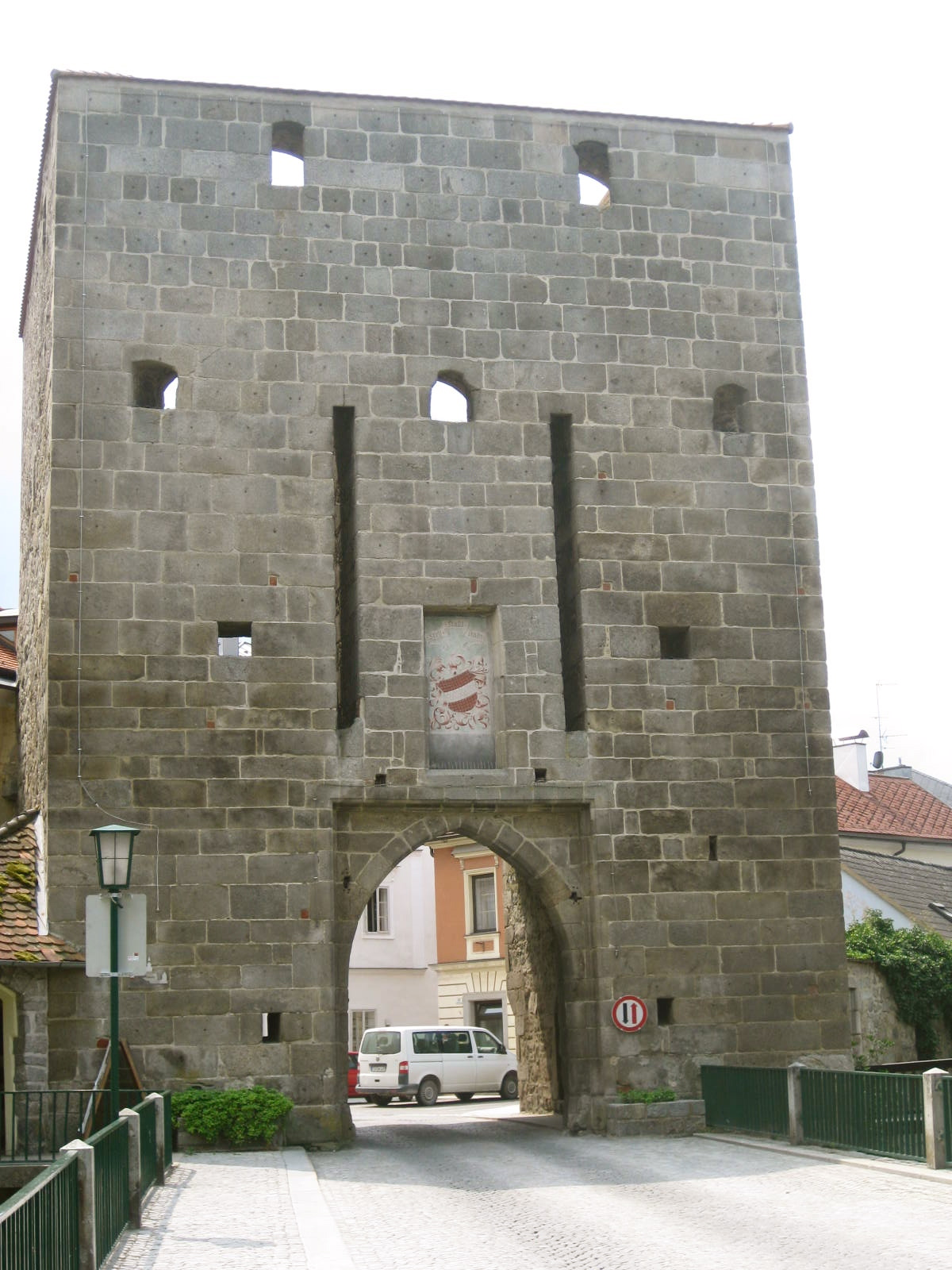
Böhmertor

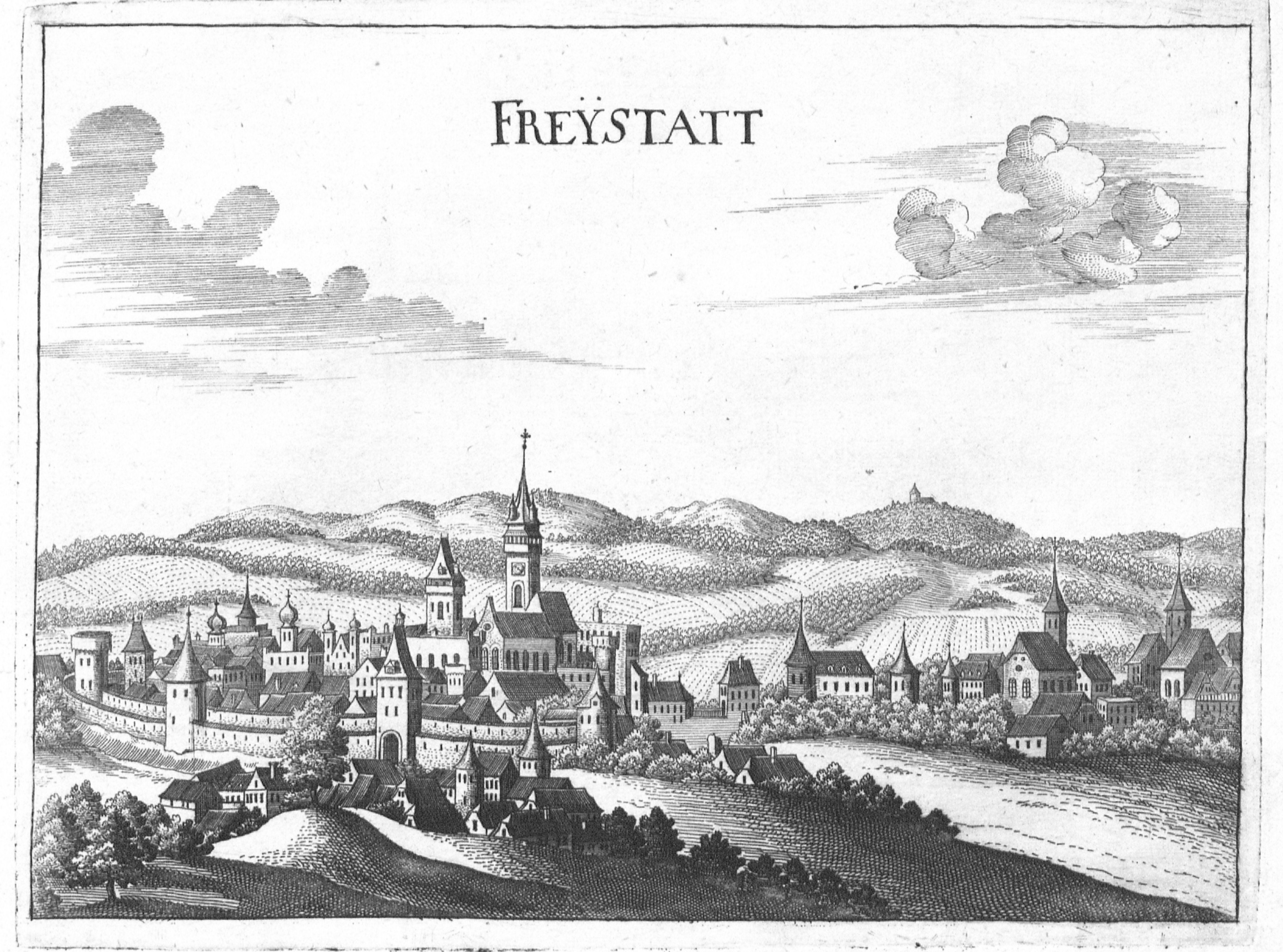
Freistadt Vischer

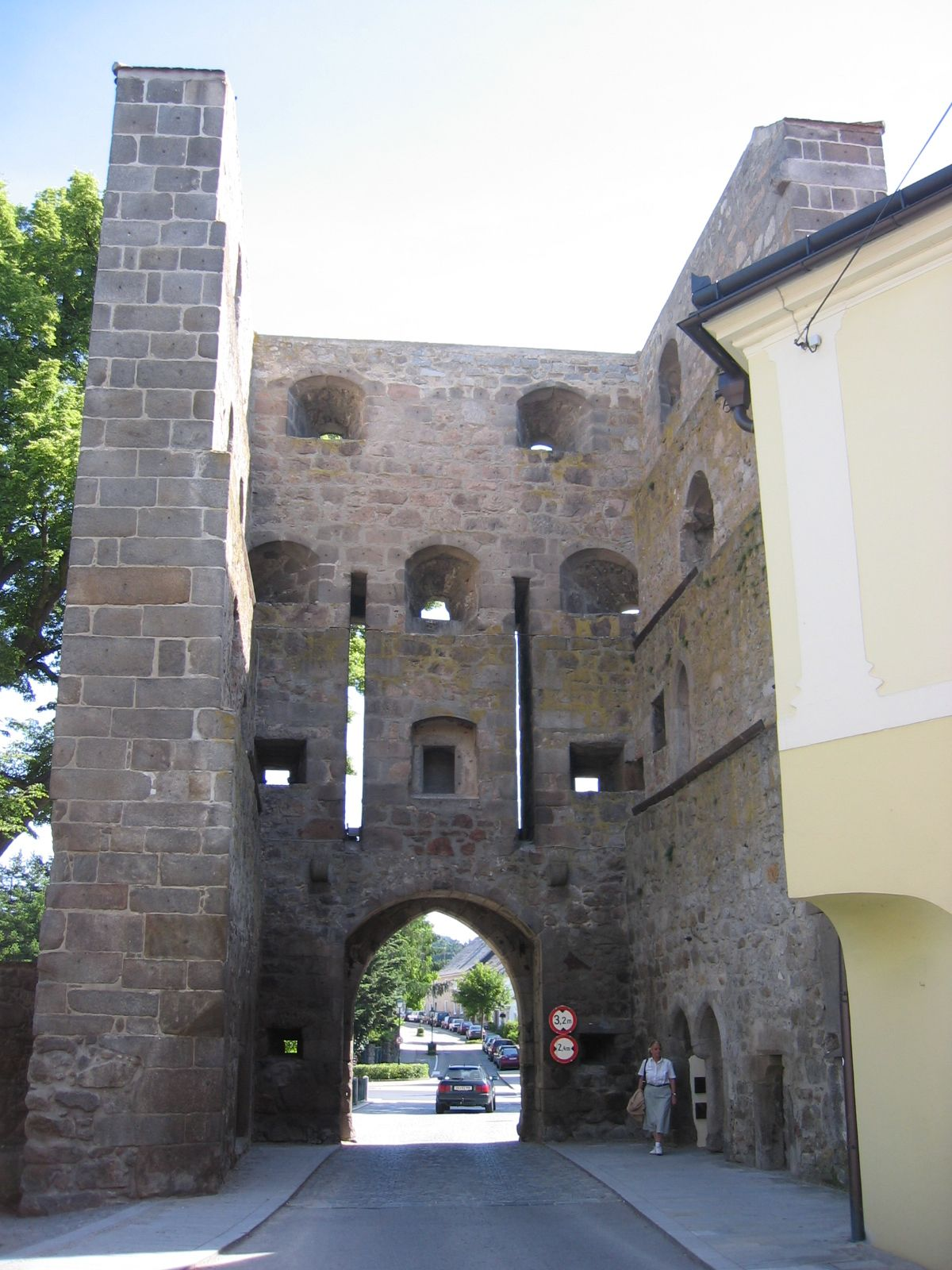
Böhmertor von innen

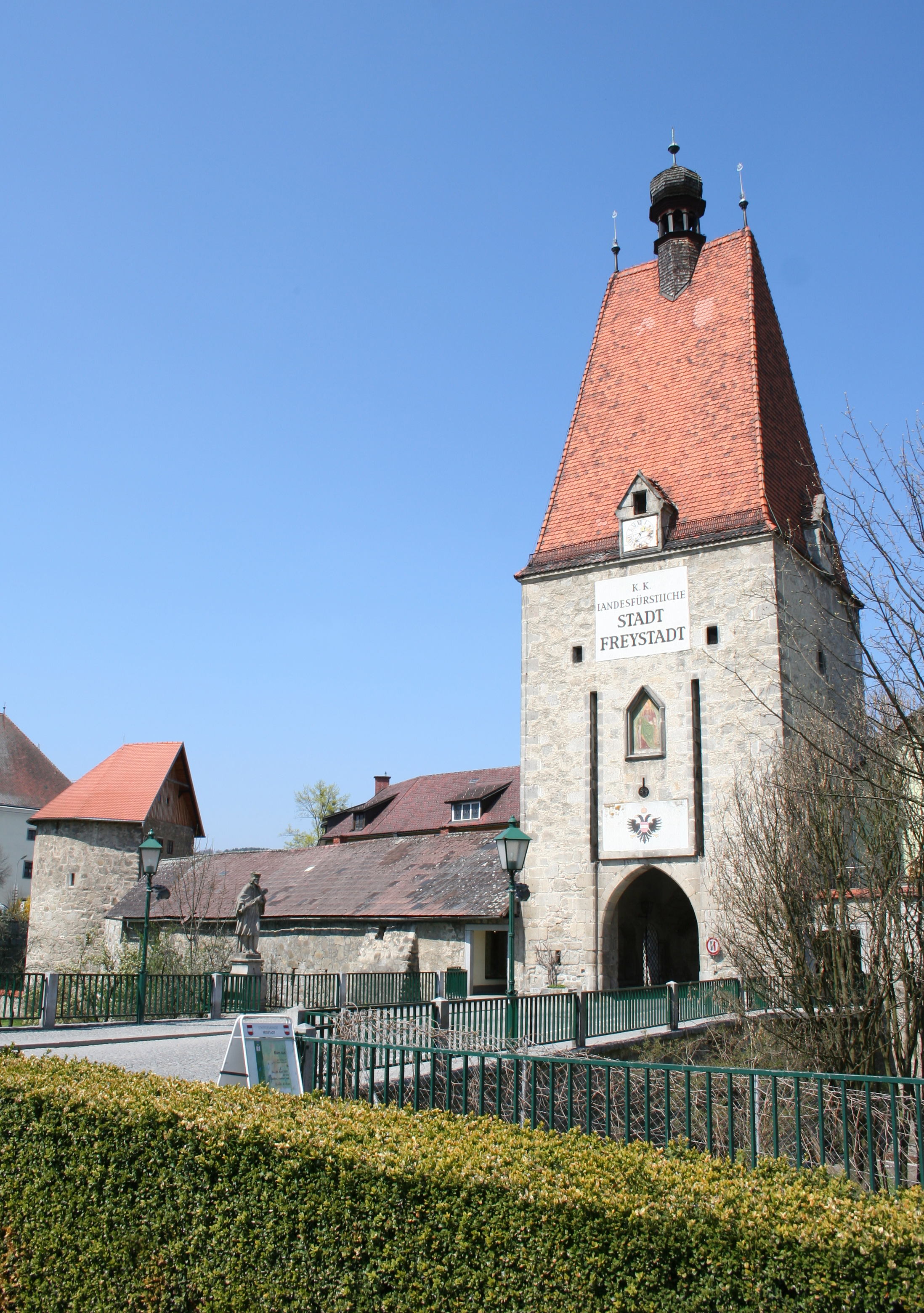
Linzertor

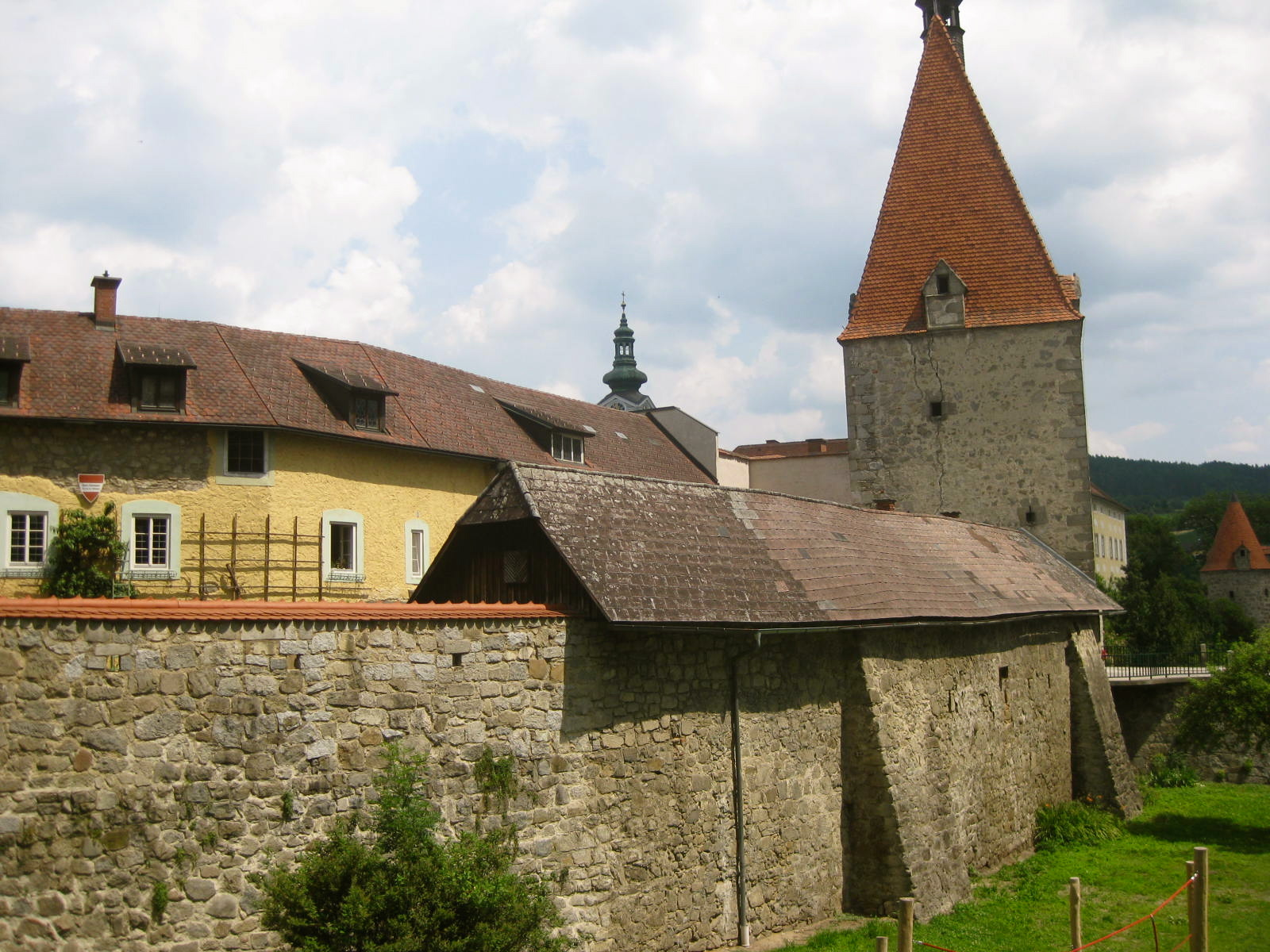
Linzertor

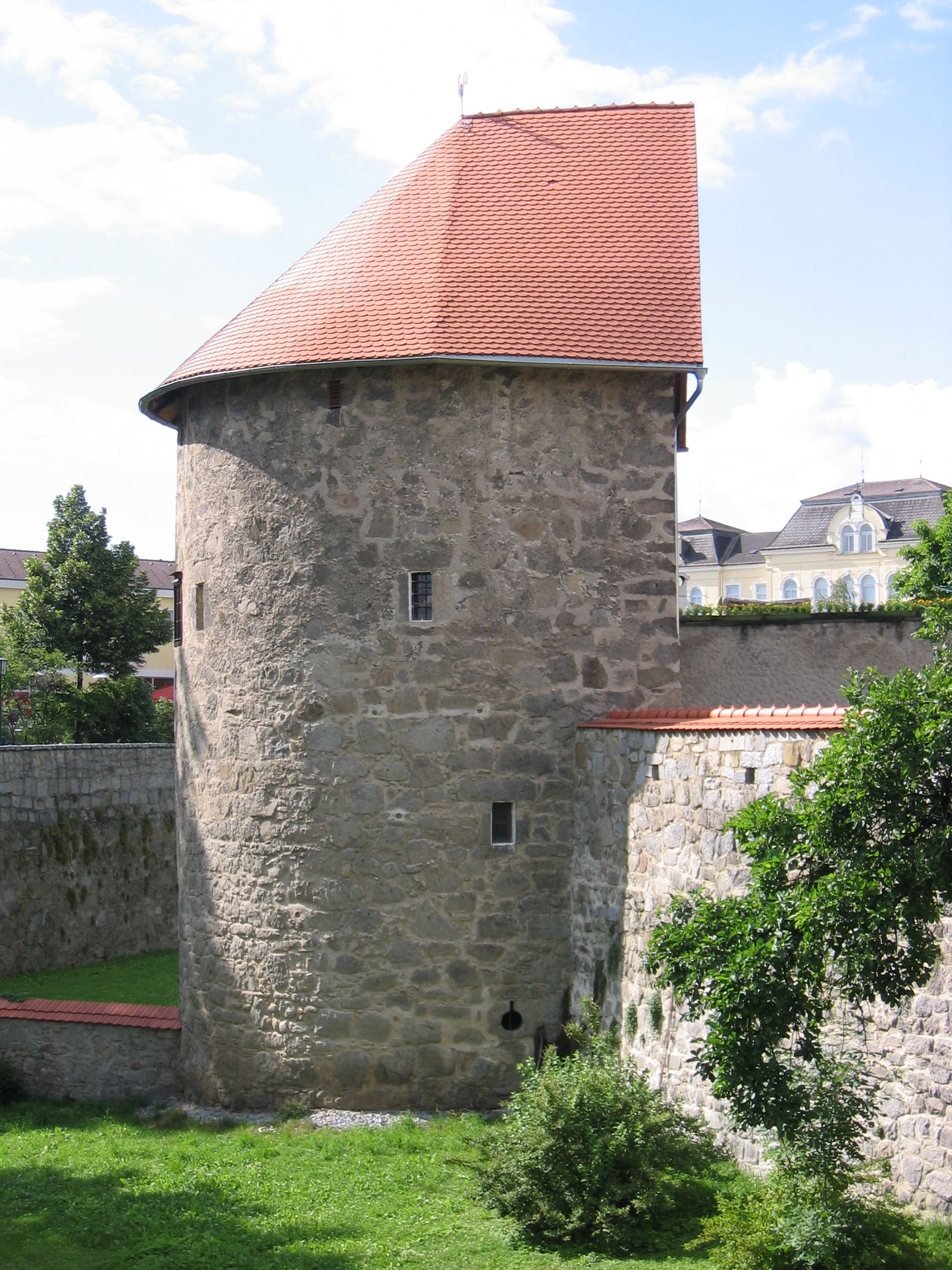
Bürgerkorpsturm

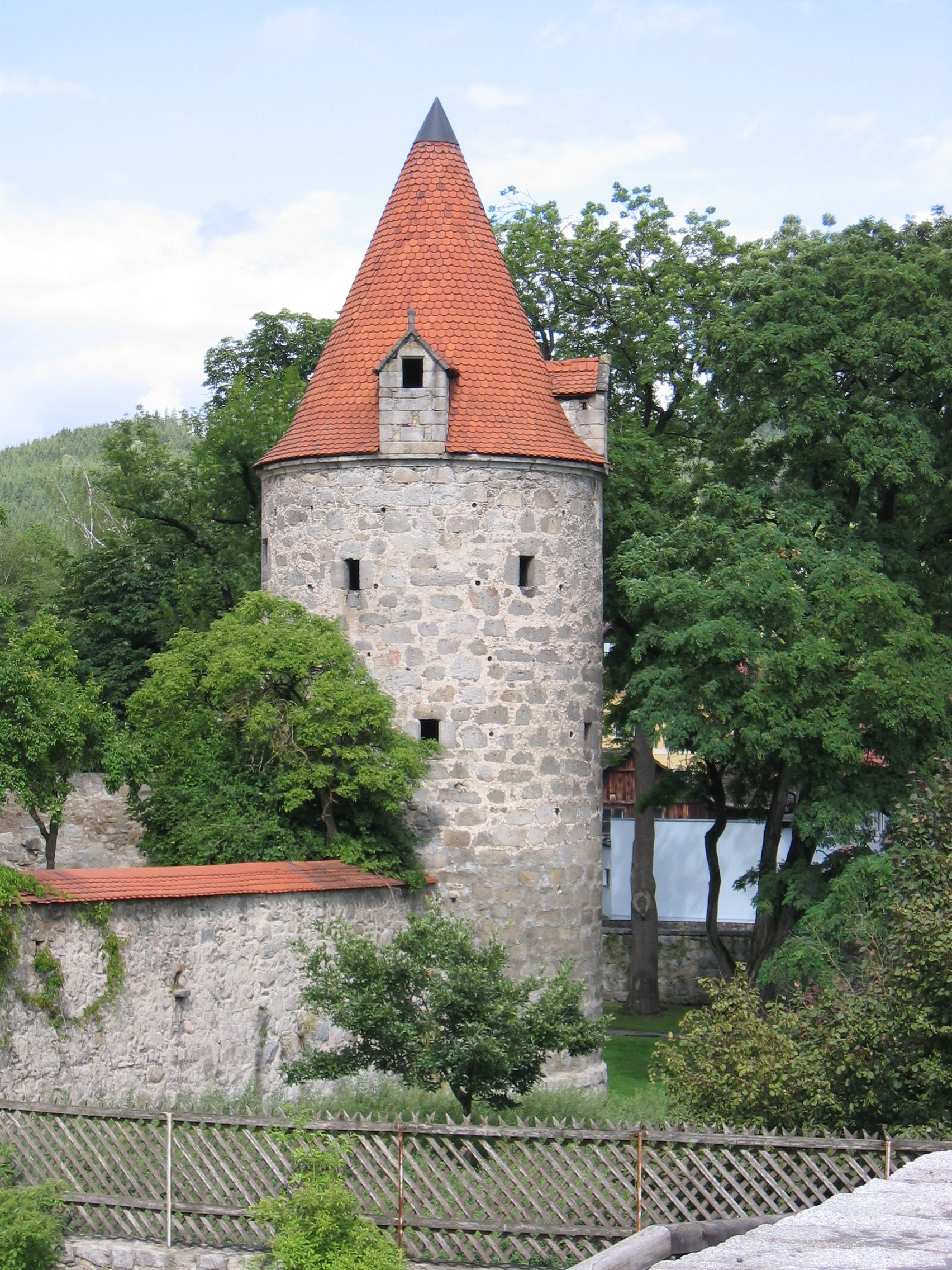
Dechanthofturm
- Gmunden. Today only fragments of the wall survive, with a round tower at the northeast corner. The Vischer print of the town in 1672 shows two square towers, and the quay fronting the Traunsee was defended with vertical palisading, with a gateway on the SW, a watergate onto the Traunsee, and a tower by the bridge across the river Traum. There was a gatetower set into in the North wall.
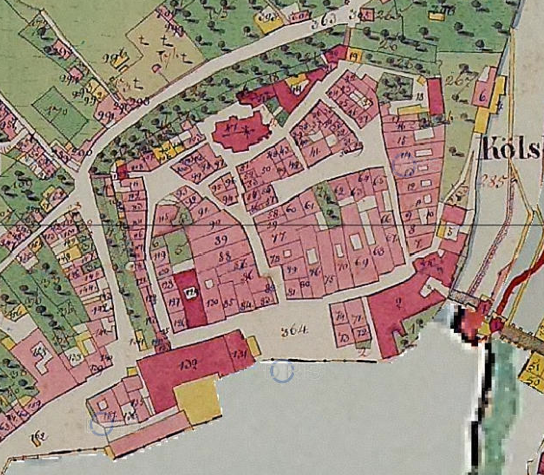
Gmunden. Franziszeische Landesaufnahme 2nd Military Survey c1835

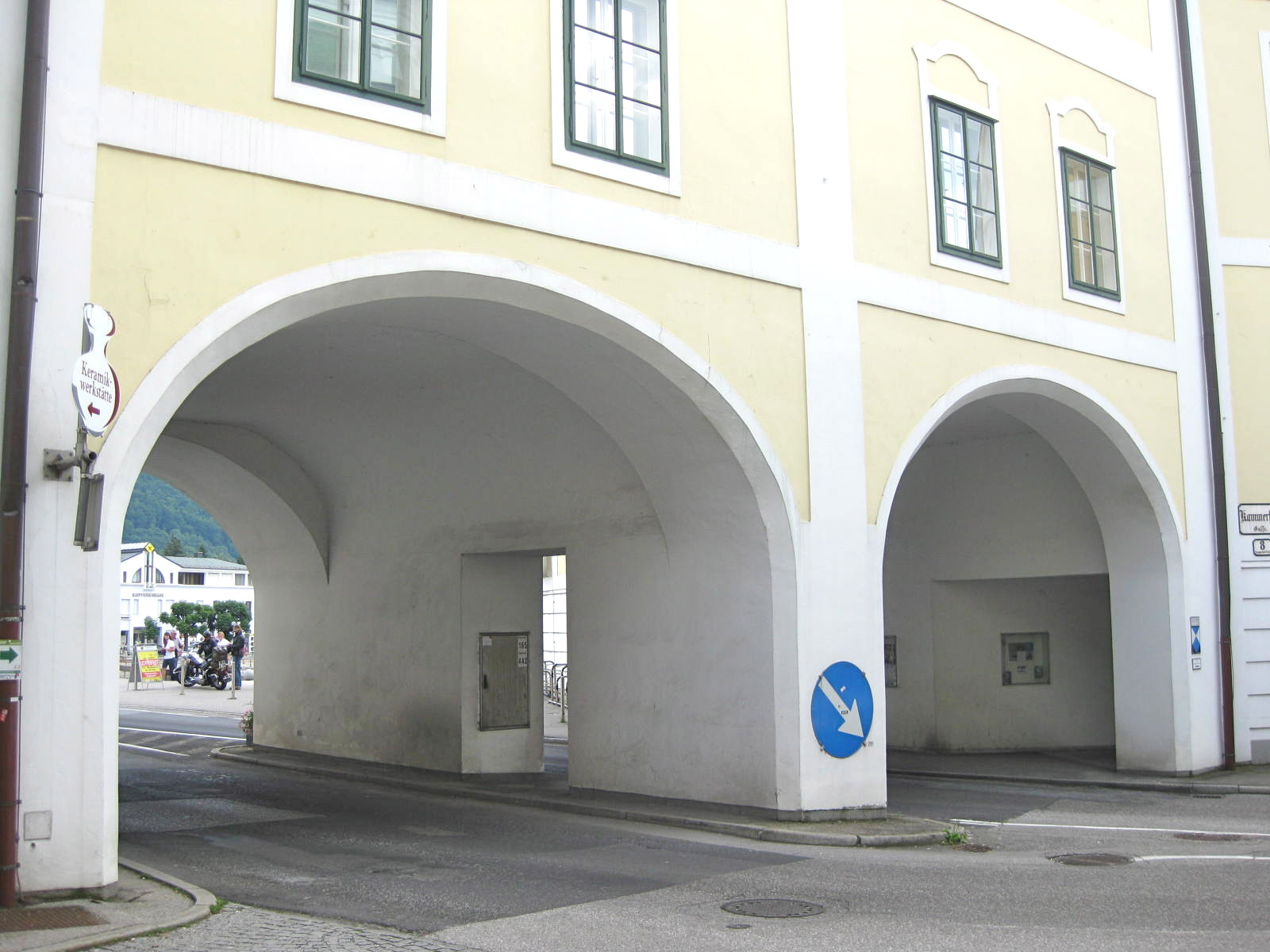
Gmunden Town Gateway
- Haslach an der Muhl. A market town fortified in the 14th century. Three gate-towers are shown on the Kaiser Franz I map (post 1817) but only one survives in the north west corner, adjacent to a round tower, with another tower on the SW. The walls survive on the west and south mainly incorporated into existing buildings.
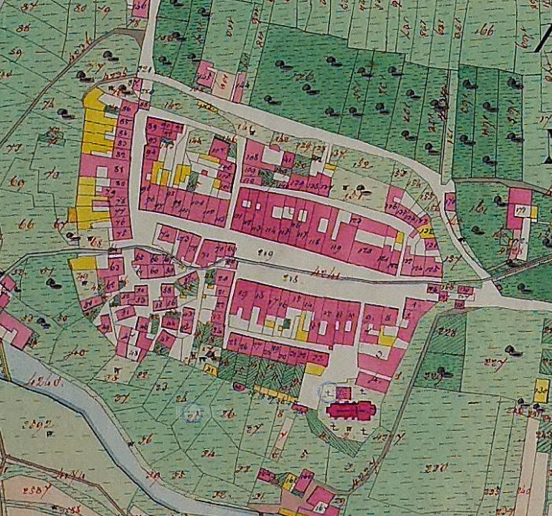
Haslach an der Mühl, Upper Austria. 'Franziszeische Landesaufnahme' 2nd Military Survey c. 1835

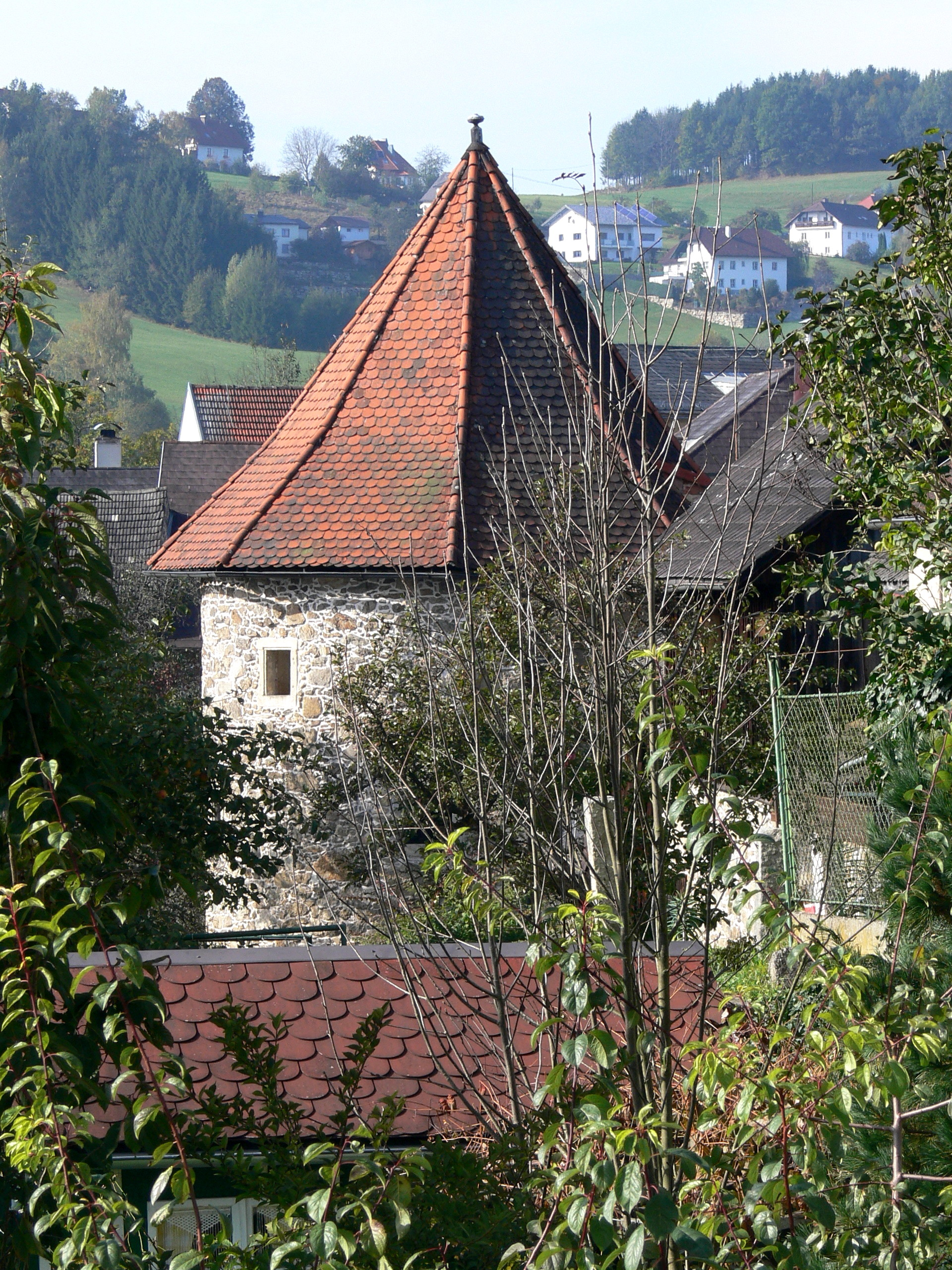
Haslach - Stadtmauerturm

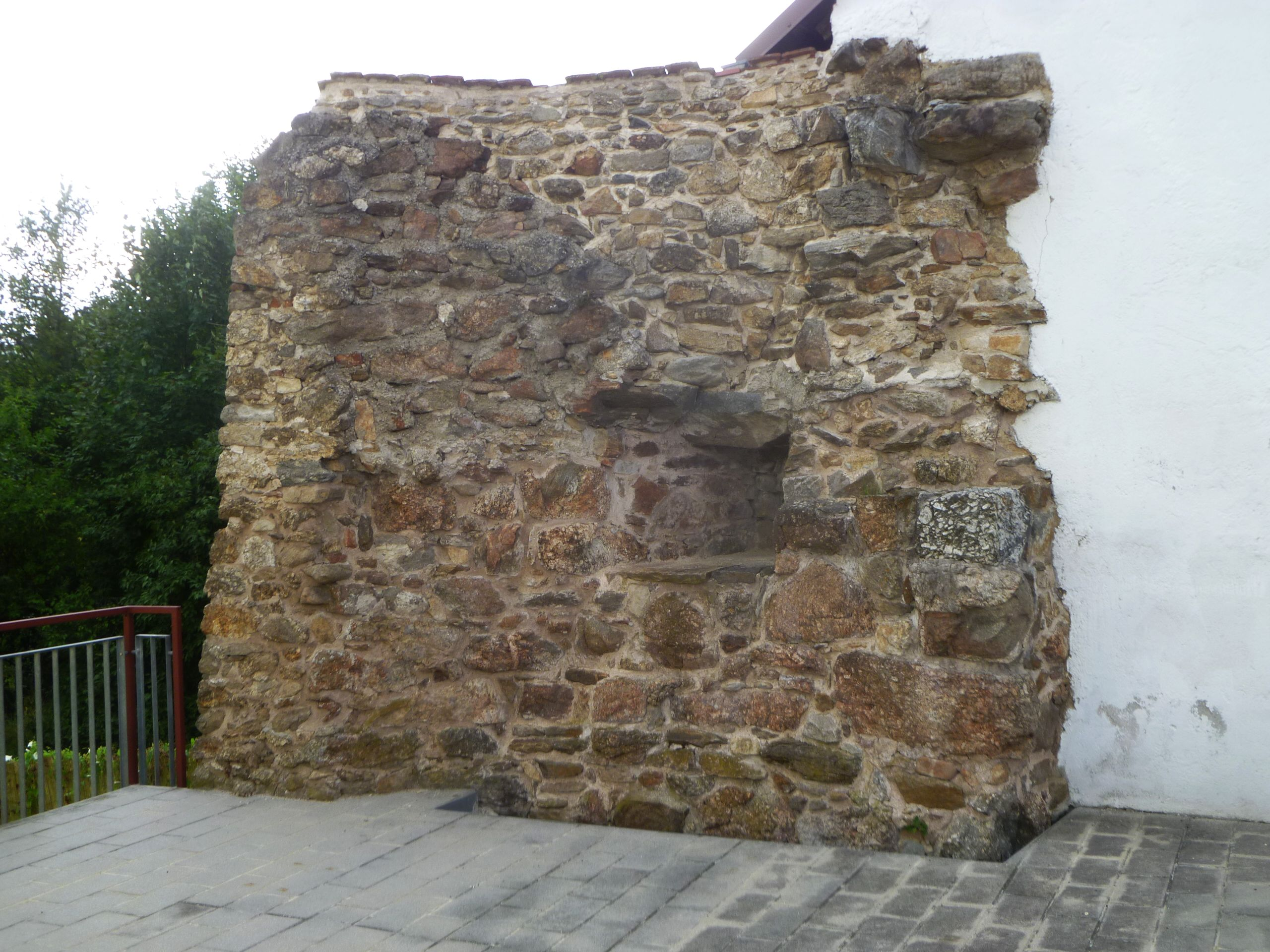
Haslach an der Mühl (Befestigung bei Marktplatz)

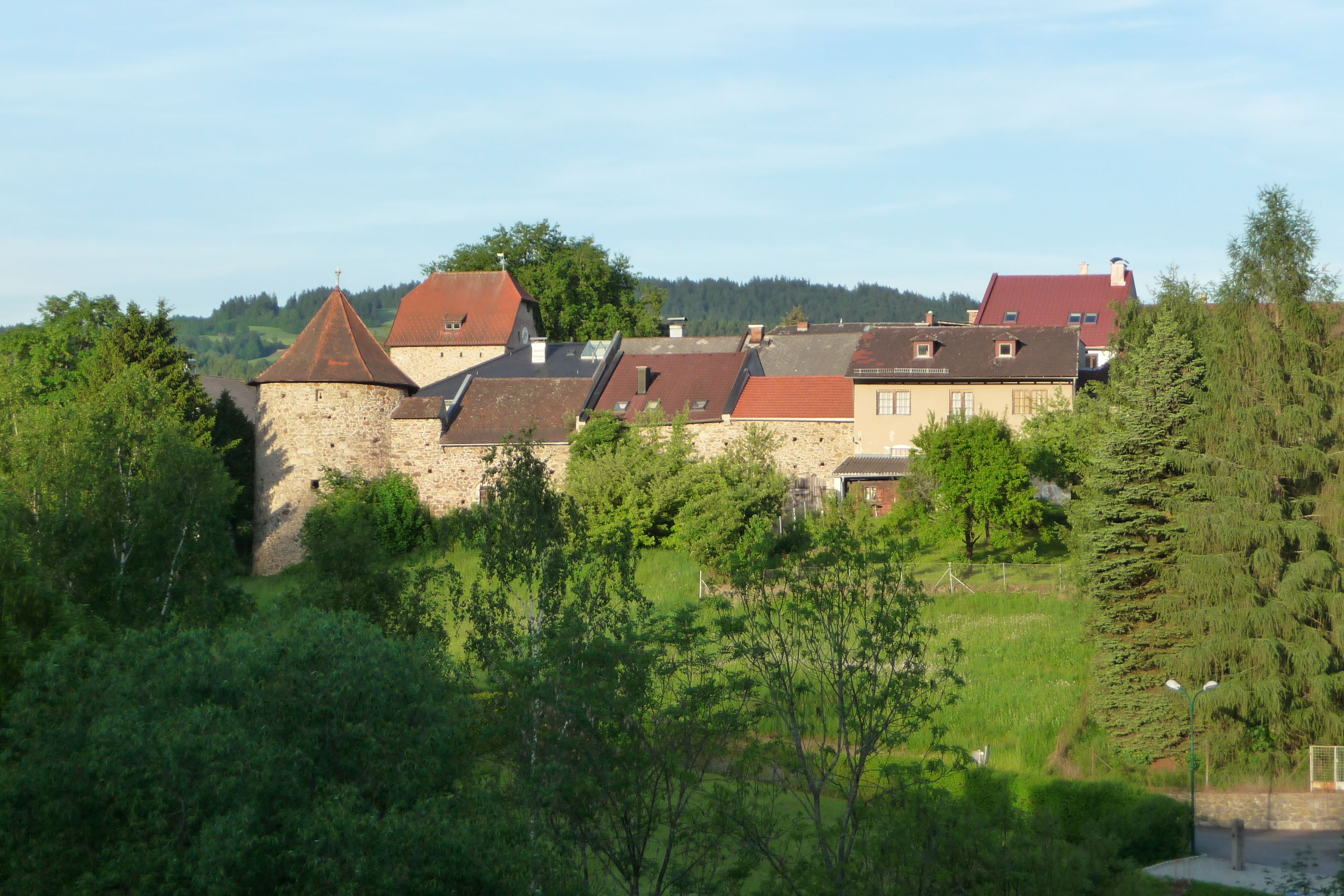
Haslach Mauer

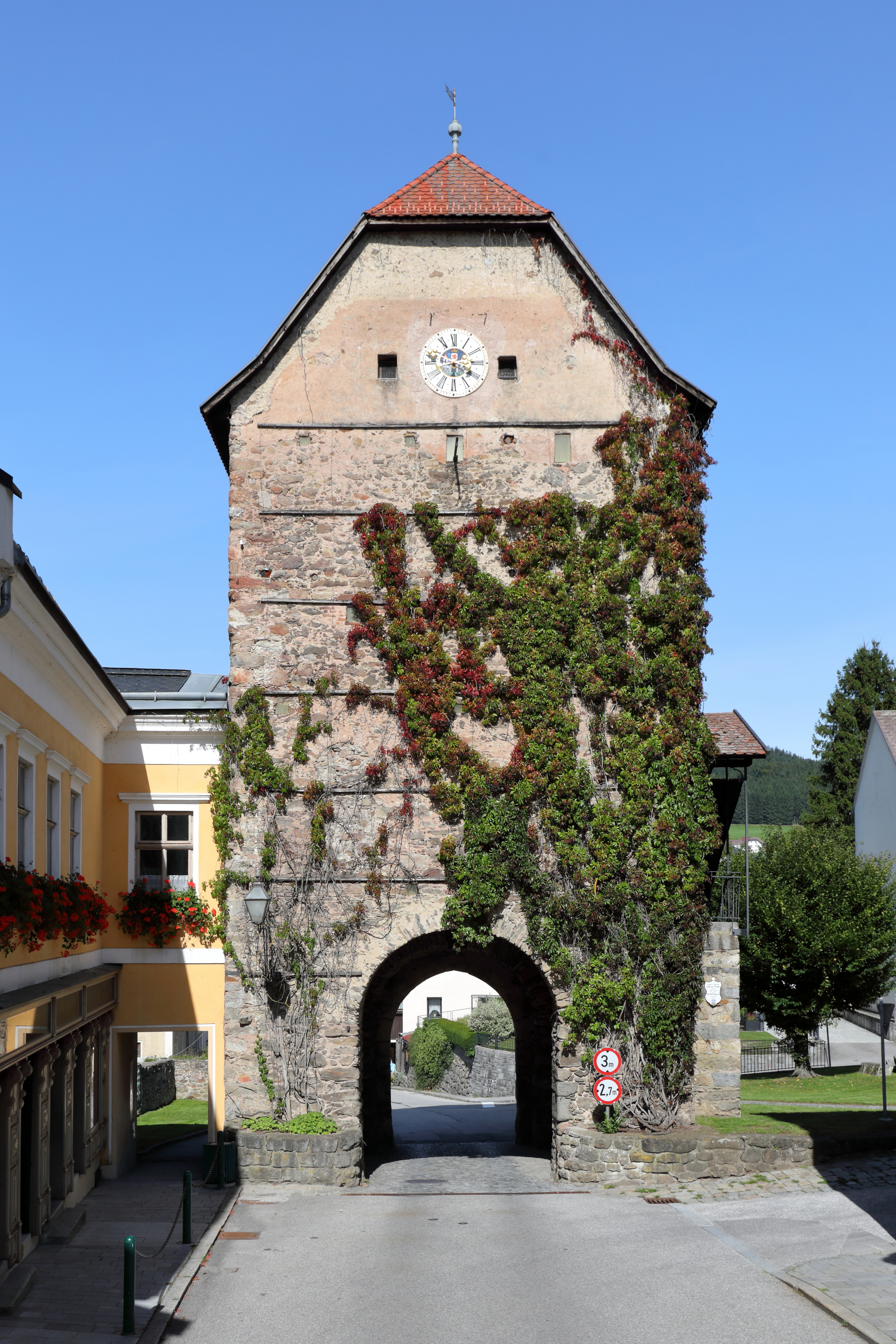
Gate-tower

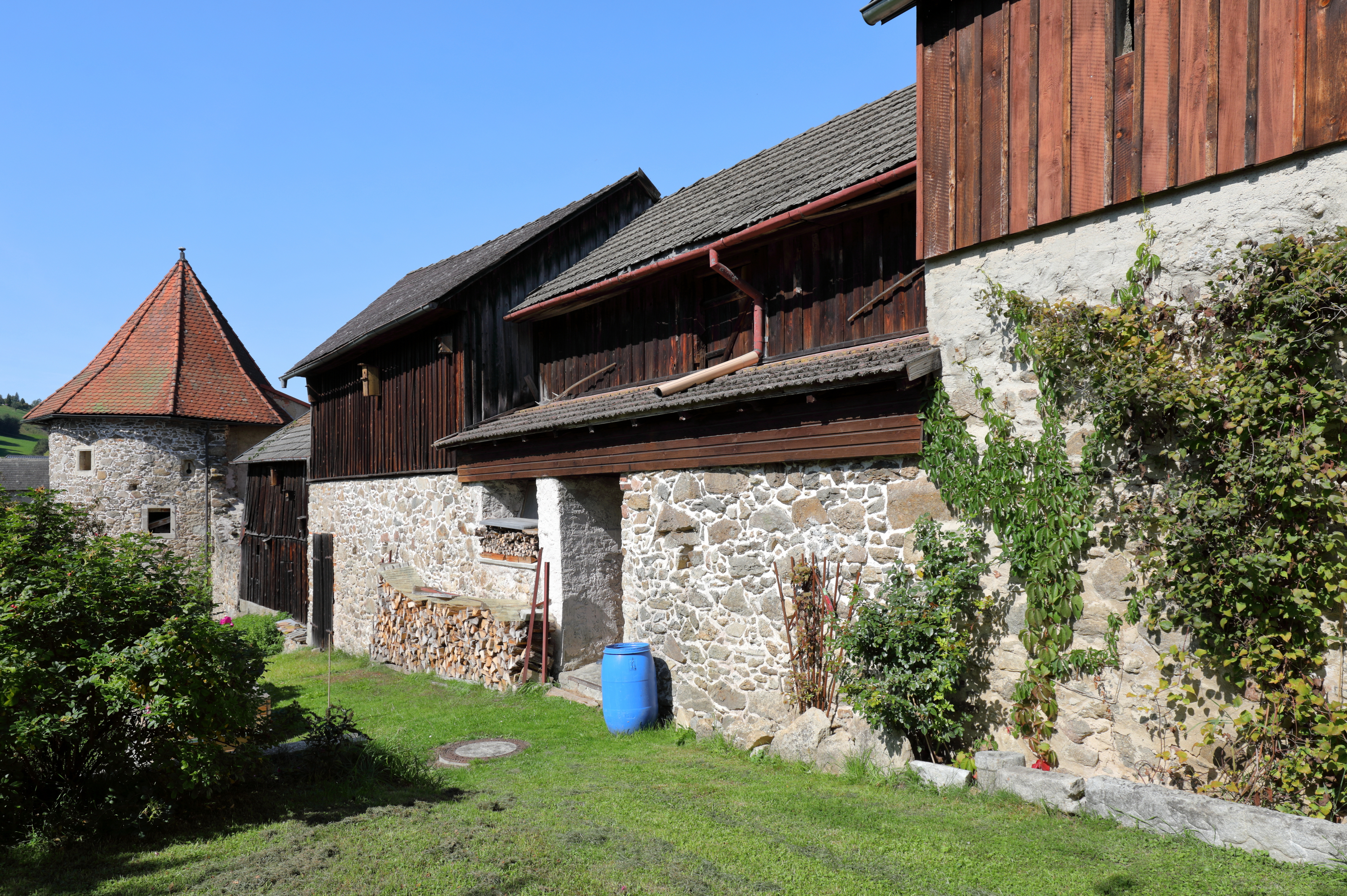
South side of the wall

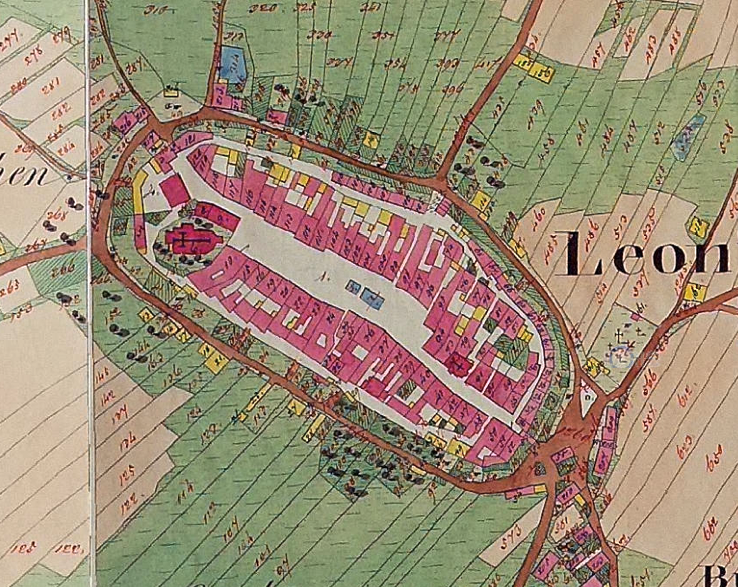
Leonfelden, Upper Austria. 'Franziszeische Landesaufnahme' 2nd Military Survey c. 1835

- Leonfelden. First mentioned in 1146 and granted a market in 1356. In the Hussite Wars, Leonfelden formed a frontier position with Bohemia and was burnt in 1422, 1426 and 1427. Ovoid defended enclosure with long rectangular marketplace, which would initially have been defended by a bank with palisade, but around 1470 this was replaced by a wall 891 metres in circuit and moat 9–12 meters wide. The Franz II Kastater (1836- ?) shows that there were two gateways (Böhmer– and Linzertor).
- Linz. The Roman fort of ‘Lentia’ was established early in the 1st century to the south of Linz Castle and probably between the Romergasse and the Baumbach Strasse. The Bavarians established themselves here in the 8th century or earlier and the surviving church of St Martin (west of the castle) was first mentioned in 799. A market was mentioned in 844 (?) and this probably refers to the ‘Alte Stadt’, a settlement with a Y ‘Dreiech’ marketplace, which grew up to the east of the castle. In 1240 Linz was granted a charter and it may have been at this time that the new town with a long rectangular marketplace and a grid plan was laid out to the east of the Alte Stadt. Both this new town and the Alte Stadt were now enclosed in a rectangular defensive system, presumably walled, which was joined to the castle on the west side. The Braun and Hogenberg print of 1594 gives a good idea of how the medieval town developed. There were square towers on the four corners of the walled town, a gate-tower leading to the bridge, built in 1497 across the Danube on the north and a tall watch tower on the gate leading from the marketplace in the S. This view looking across the Danube from the north was copied with modification by Merian in 1679 and Vischer in 1672, but Merian in 1679 adds a completely new view (from the E) of Linz showing that it had been extensively re-fortified with three large roundels added on the east and south and two roundells to the west of the castle. The Roundels were joined by a massive curtain wall and a wide inner moat or ditch. There were no additional defences on the north (Danube). This defensive work seems to be more likely to be 16th, rather than 17th century in date. The walls were demolished by the French from 1800 onwards. The Franz II Kataster (Map - post 1817) shows only one Roundell and the two gate-towers remaining and these had been demolished by the 1830s. Today only parts of the moat survive in the Theater Platz and Oberes Graben.
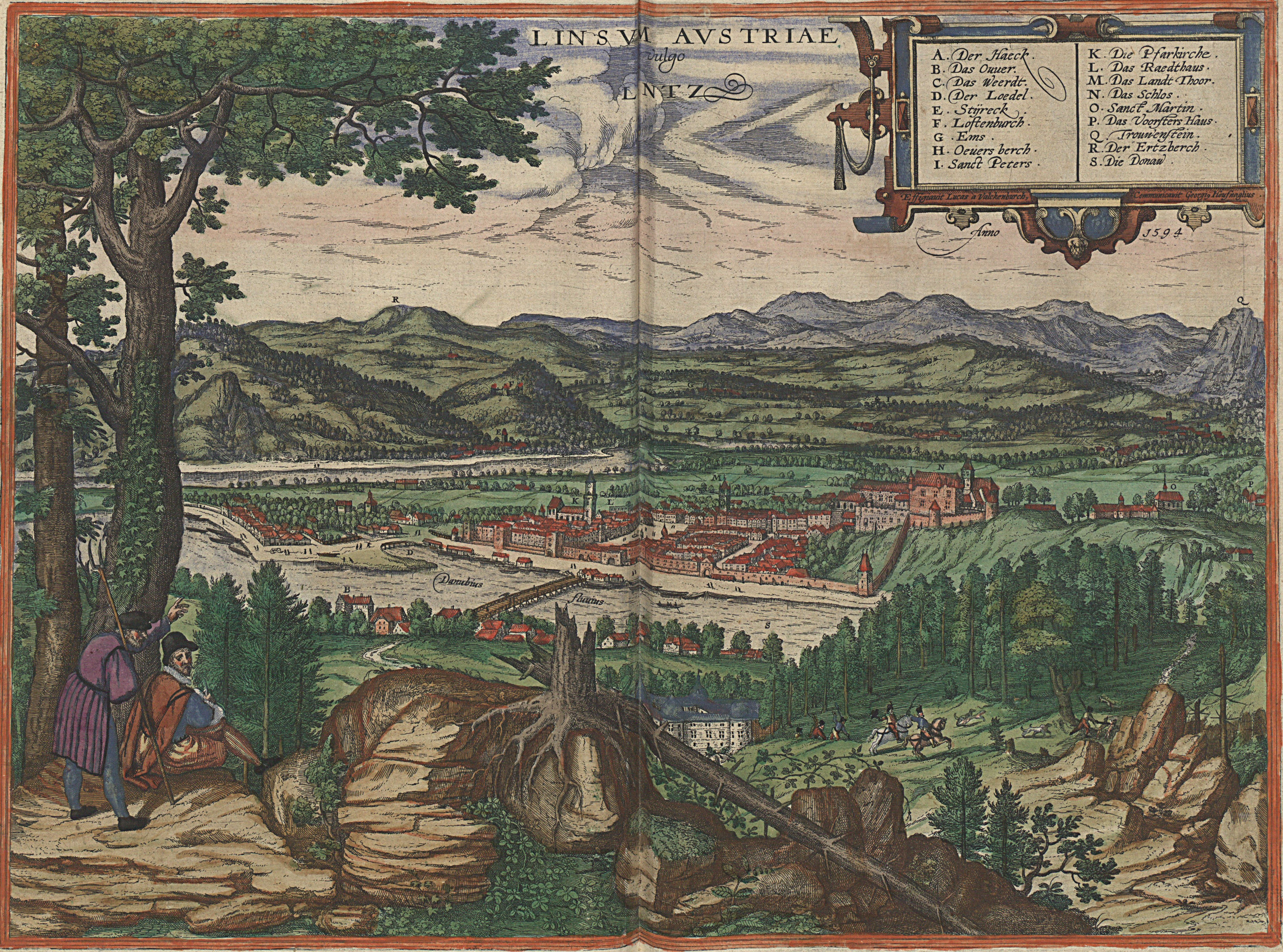
Braun and Hogenberg LINSVM AVSTRIAE Anno 1594

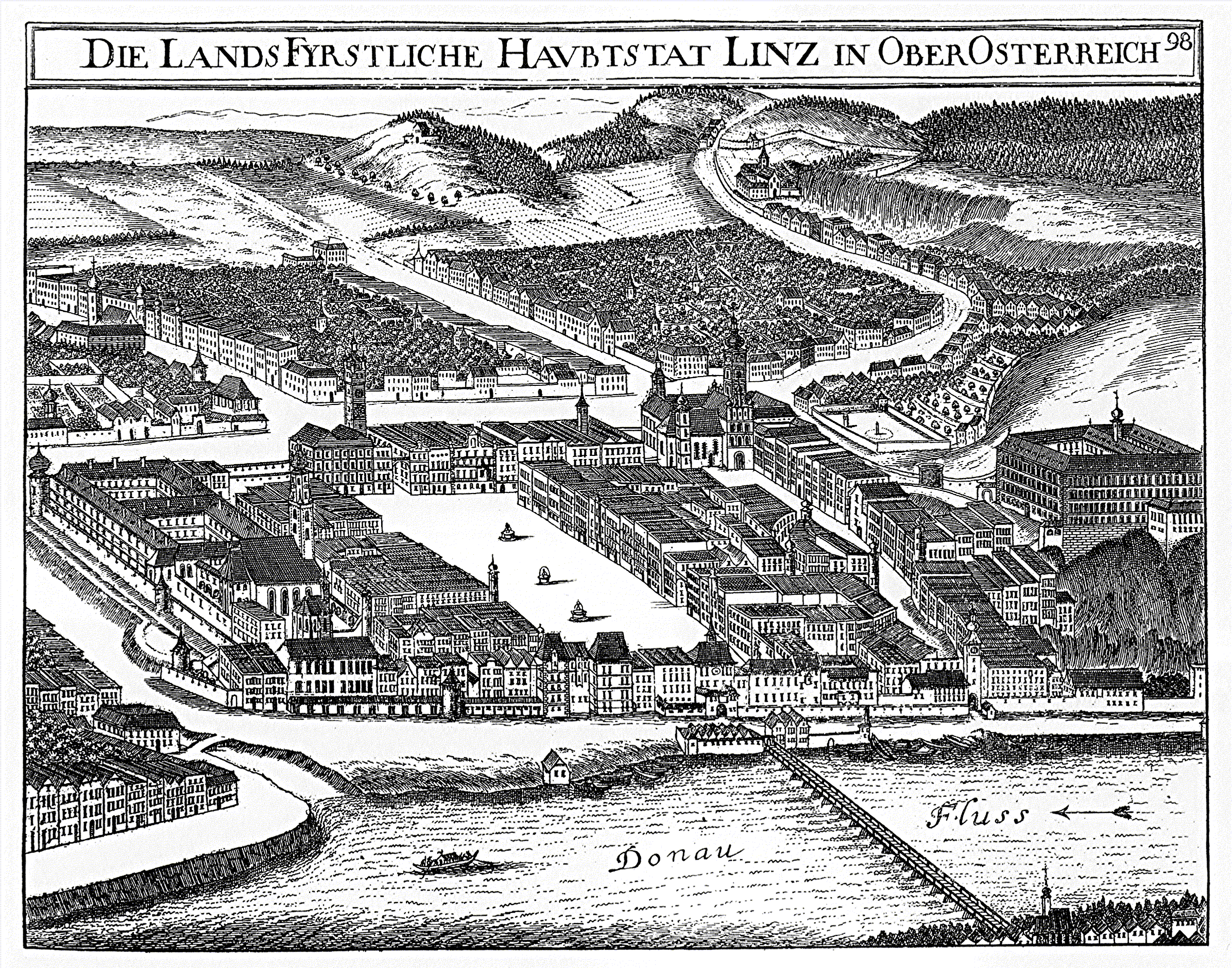
Linz- Vischer 1672

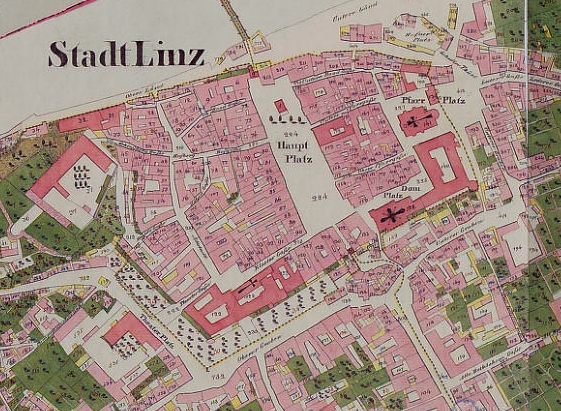
Linz. Franziszeische Landesaufnahme 2nd Military Survey c1835
- Ottensheim. On the evidence of property boundaries Ottensheim would appear to have been a walled town and the town's coat of arms shows a gate-tower with walls. Also The Franz II Kataster (post-1817 map) shows a gate-tower on the north of town. The town, first mentioned in 1146, is bordered by the Danube on the S, with the castle on the west. The town is enclosed by an inner graben and an aussere graben to the north and east suggesting a double wall system rather than a bank and ditch enclosure. There is a rectangular north–south marketplace.
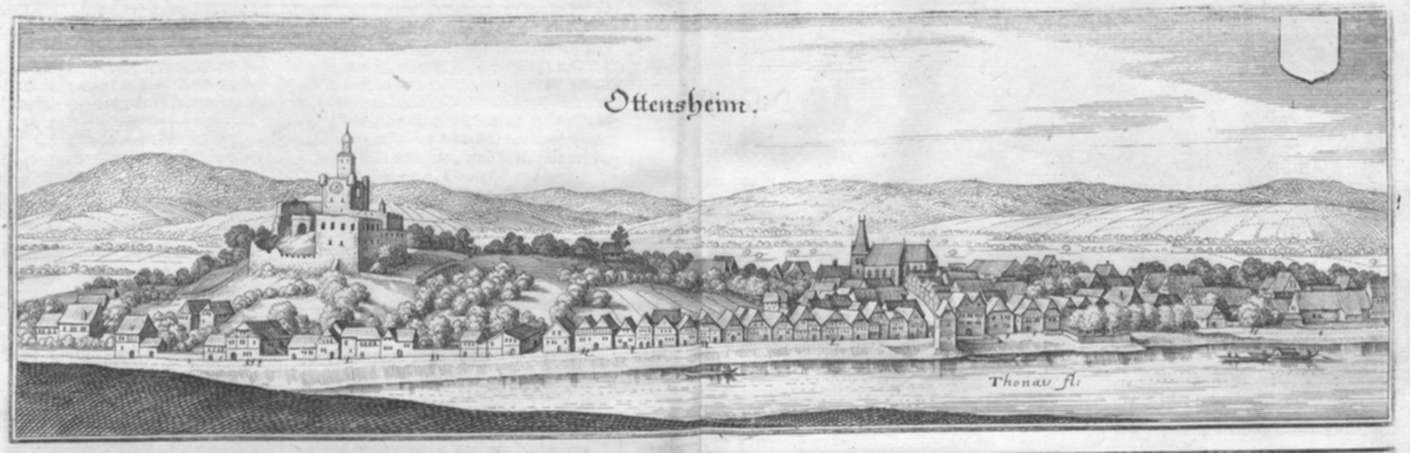
Ottensheim Merian

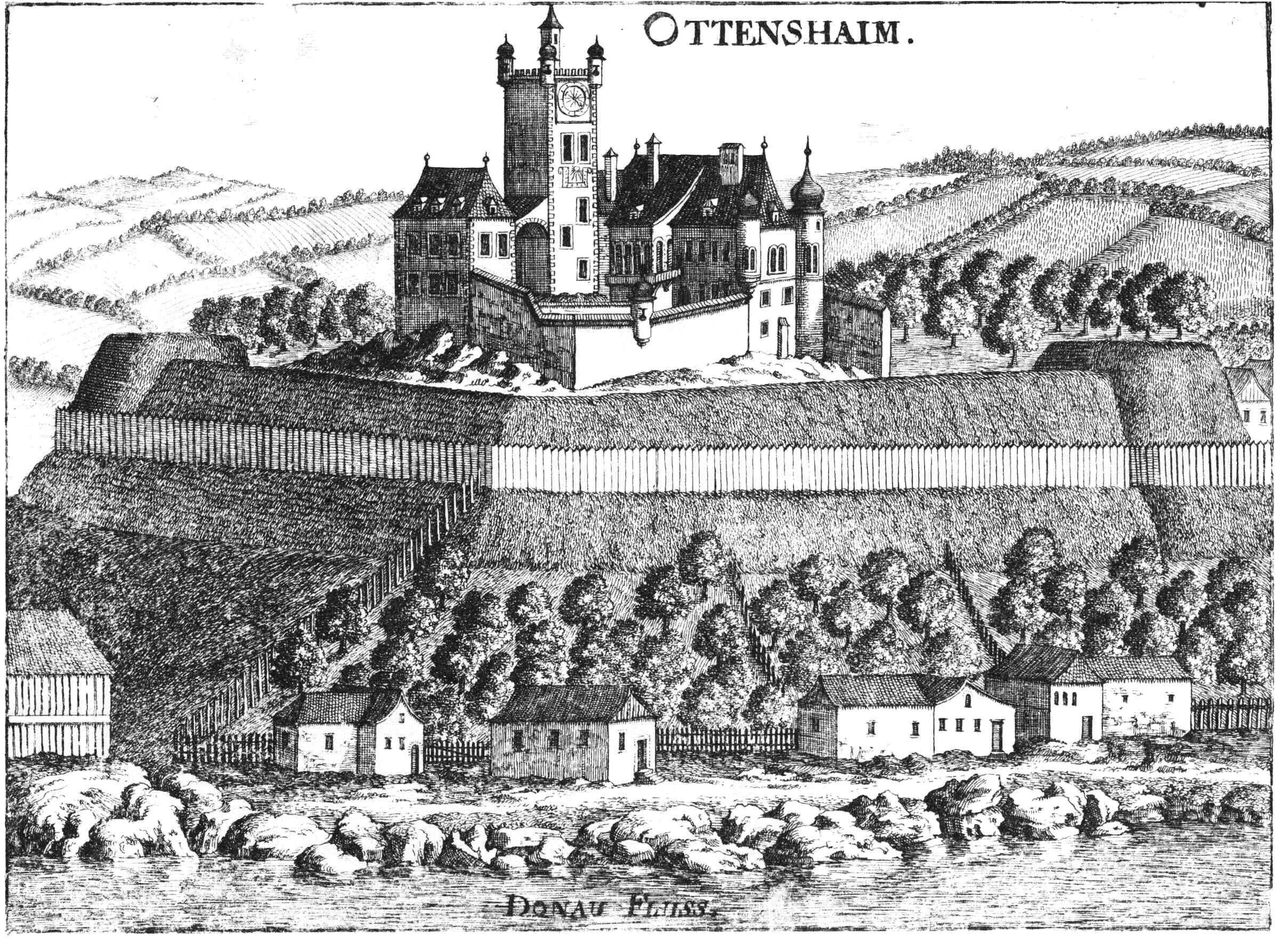
Ottensheim. Vischer, showing palisading around the castle.

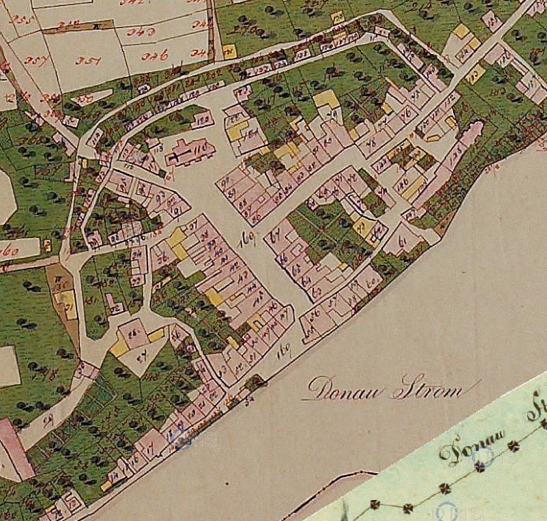
Ottensheim, Upper Austria. 'Franziszeische Landesaufnahme' 2nd Military Survey c1835
- Peuerbach was first mentioned in 1120 and was originally in the Duchy of Bavaria but transferred to the Duchy of Austria in the 12th century. The original settlement is likely to have been ovoid, but was extended to the northeast to include the church. A fragment of wall may survive to the south of the church and The Franz II Kataster (Map post-1817) shows that two gateways were still in place in the 1830s. Besieged in the Farmers’ Wars of 1625/26, and by French troops in the Napoleonic Wars. The Merian print of 1679 shows the castle in the southwest, the east wall with moat in front, the south gate and the extension of the defences around the church.
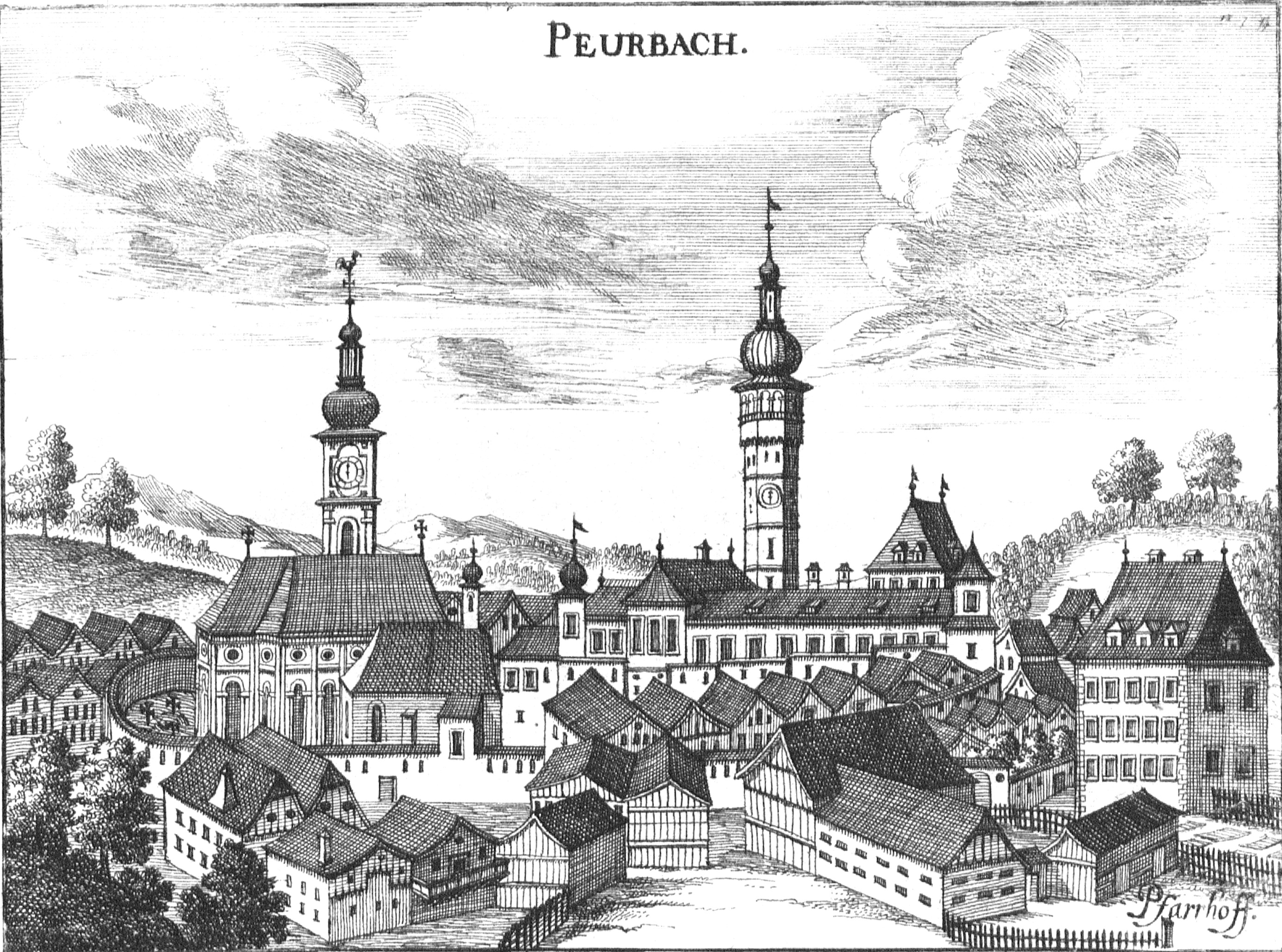
Merian print of Peuerbach 1679

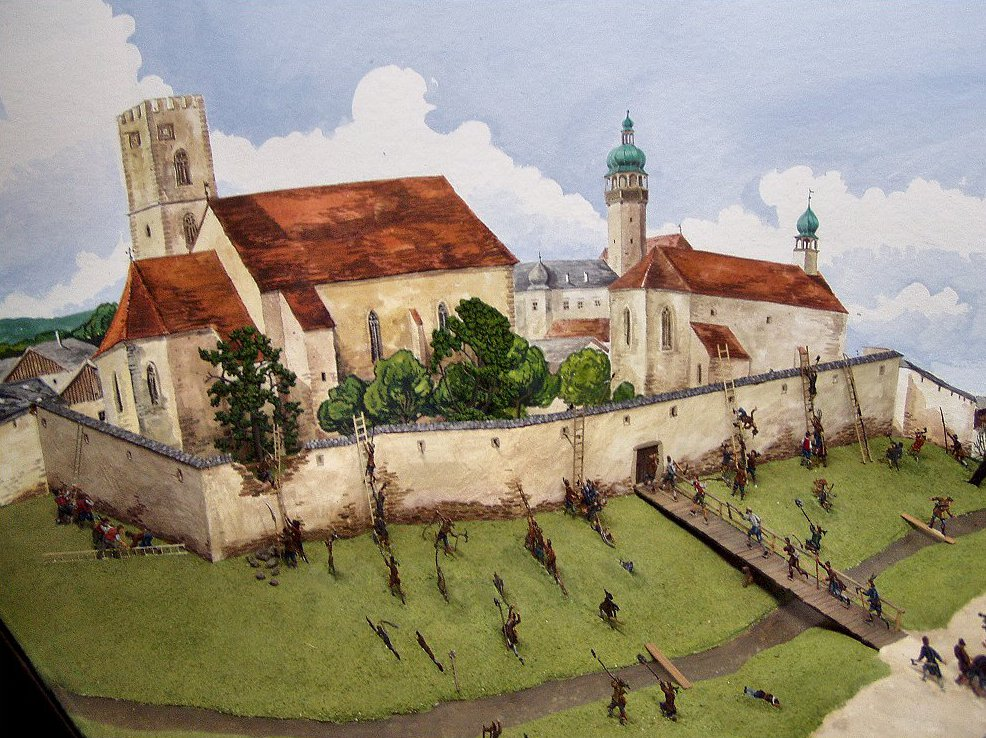
Attack on Peuerbach during the Farmer's War
- Ried im Innkreis. Reid has an almost rectangular layout with a grid pattern of squares and streets. The original settlement, first mentioned around 1160 was probably ‘Alt Reid’ to the north of the present site. The move seems to have been made in the mid 14th century and Reid was granted a market in 1364. There were four gates – of these only the Braunauer and Schardinger survive, but the Münsterer Tor and the Linzer Tor have disappeared. The town walls were demolished and the moat filled in the 18th century.
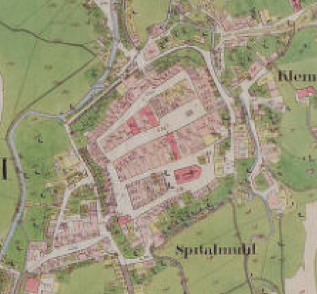
Ried im Innkreis, Upper Austria. Franziszeische Landesaufnahme 2nd Military Survey c1835

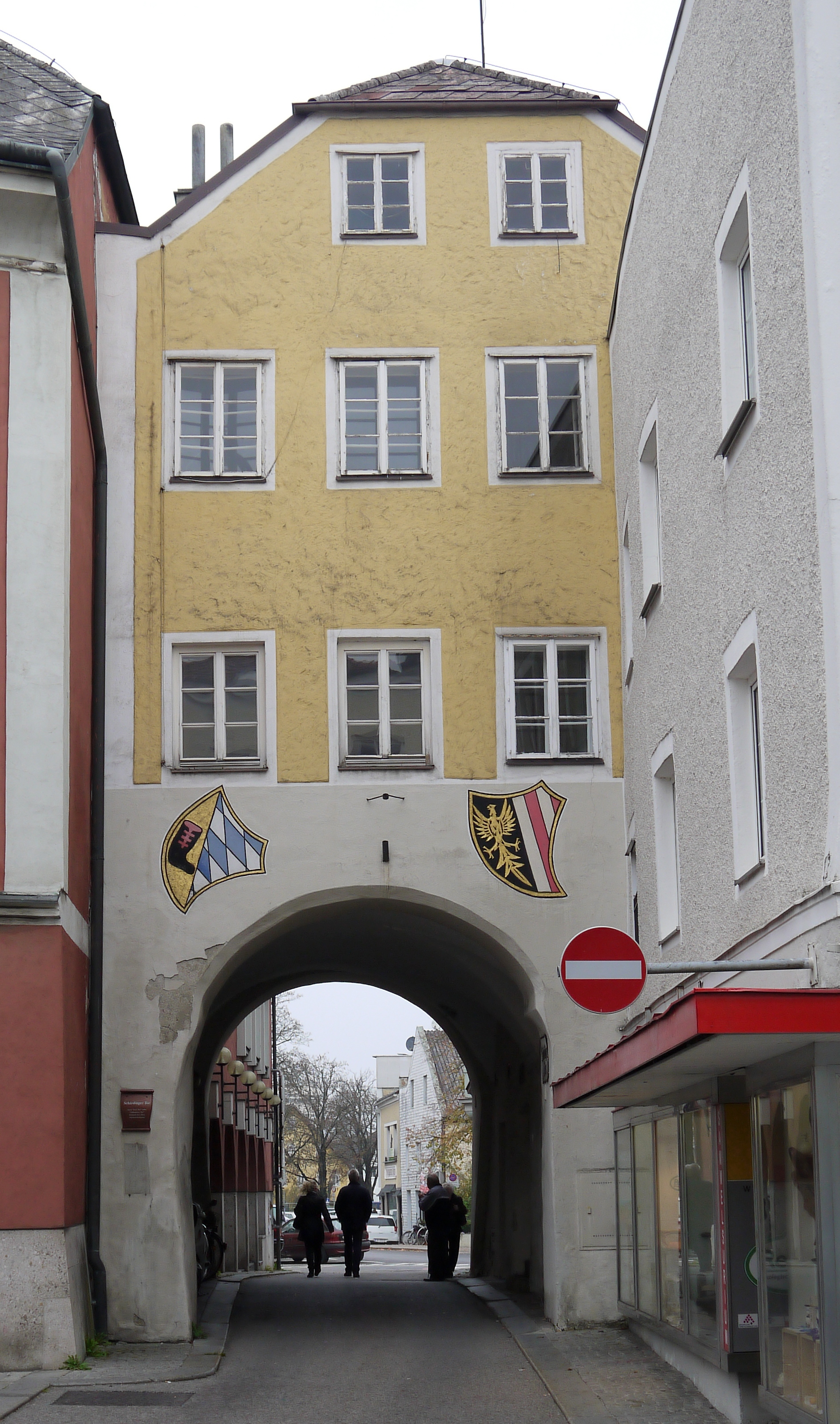
Ried Roßmarkt 31 Stadttor
- Schärding was first recorded in 804 AD as a possession of Passau Cathedral. In the 13th centuery the Wittelsbach family built a castle adjacent to the river Inn and the town developed around the castle. A charter was granted in 1316. The walls with demi-lune bastions survive on the east side and had an earthen rampart to the rear and a wide ditch in front. Parts of the walls were pulled down by French troops in 1809. On the W, the Wassertor of 1427, survives, to the north the Passau Tor and on the east is the double bastioned Linzer Tor. In the 17th century the fortifications were extended to the south to include the Kurhaus Kirke. Merian’s view of 1644 (in Topographia Bavariae) is looking across the river Inn showing the western defences and the extent to which the town was dominated by the Witelsbach castle.
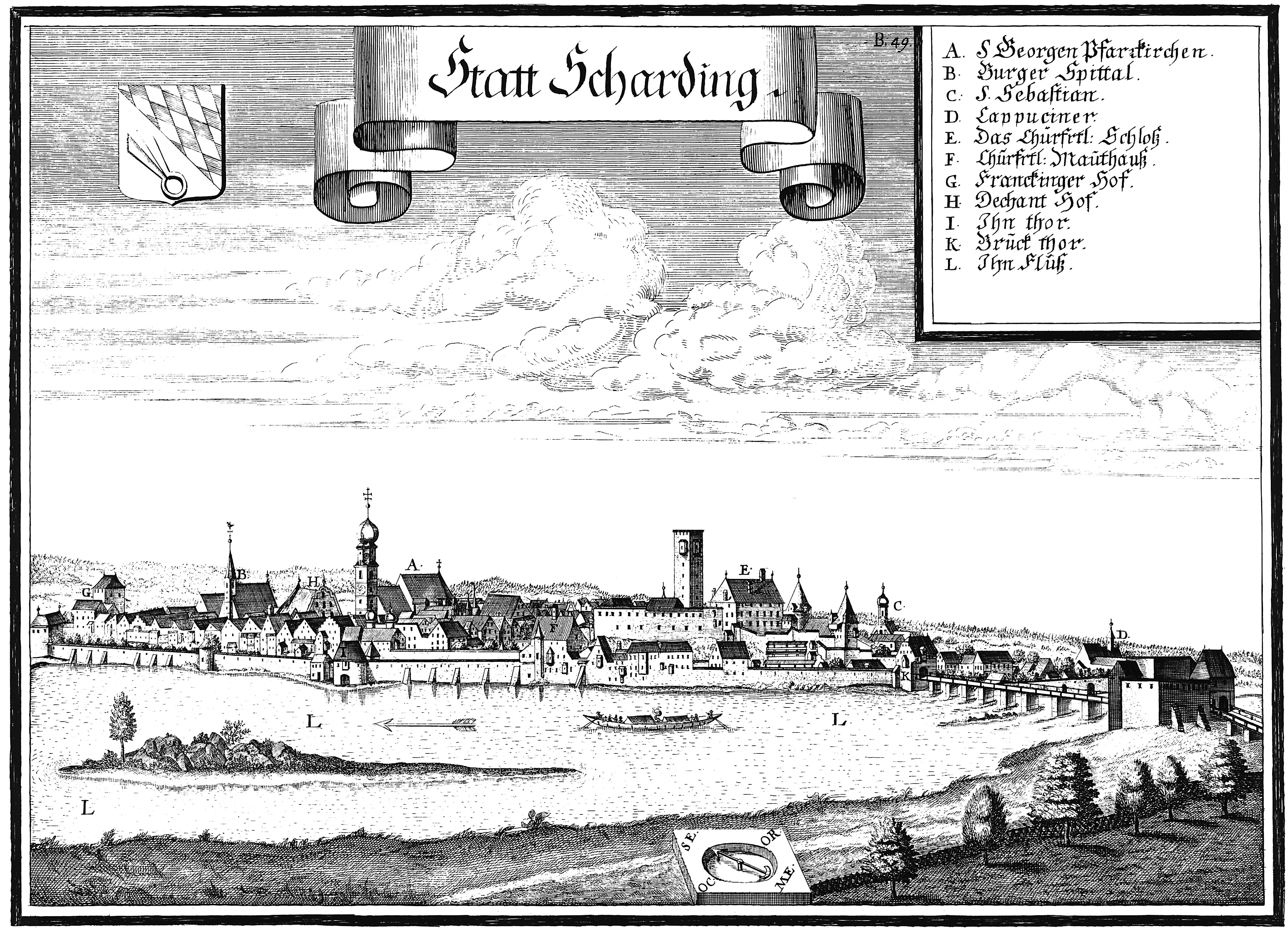
Schaerding-neu

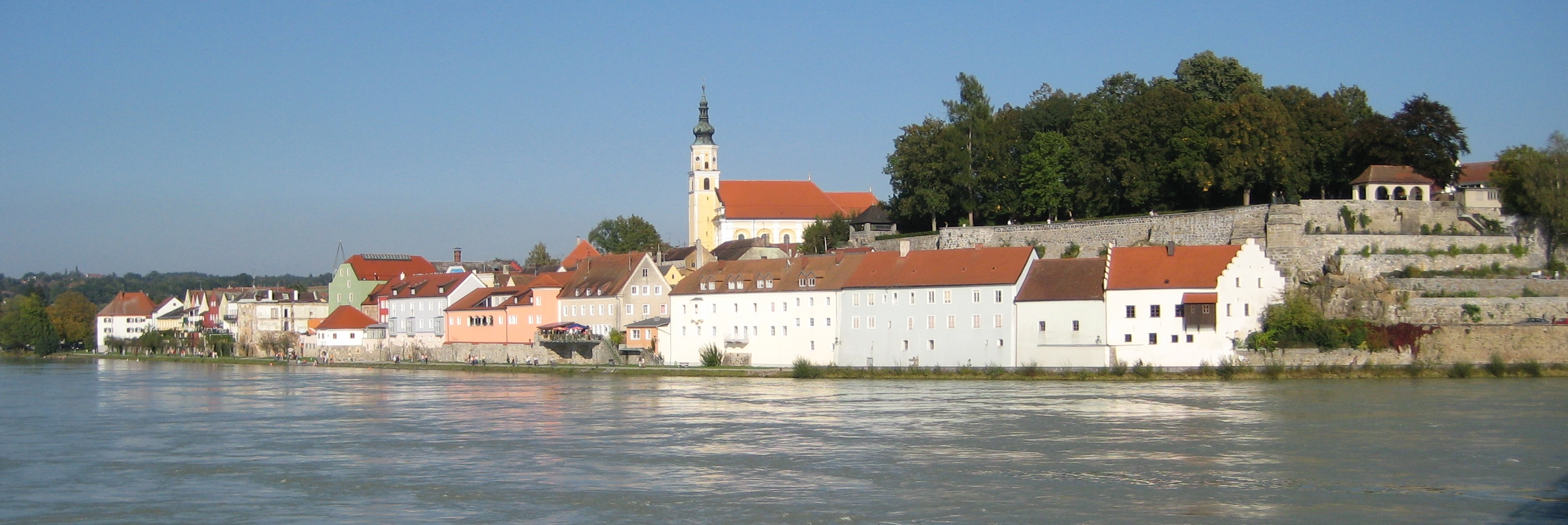
Schaerding Inn Promenade, showing walls

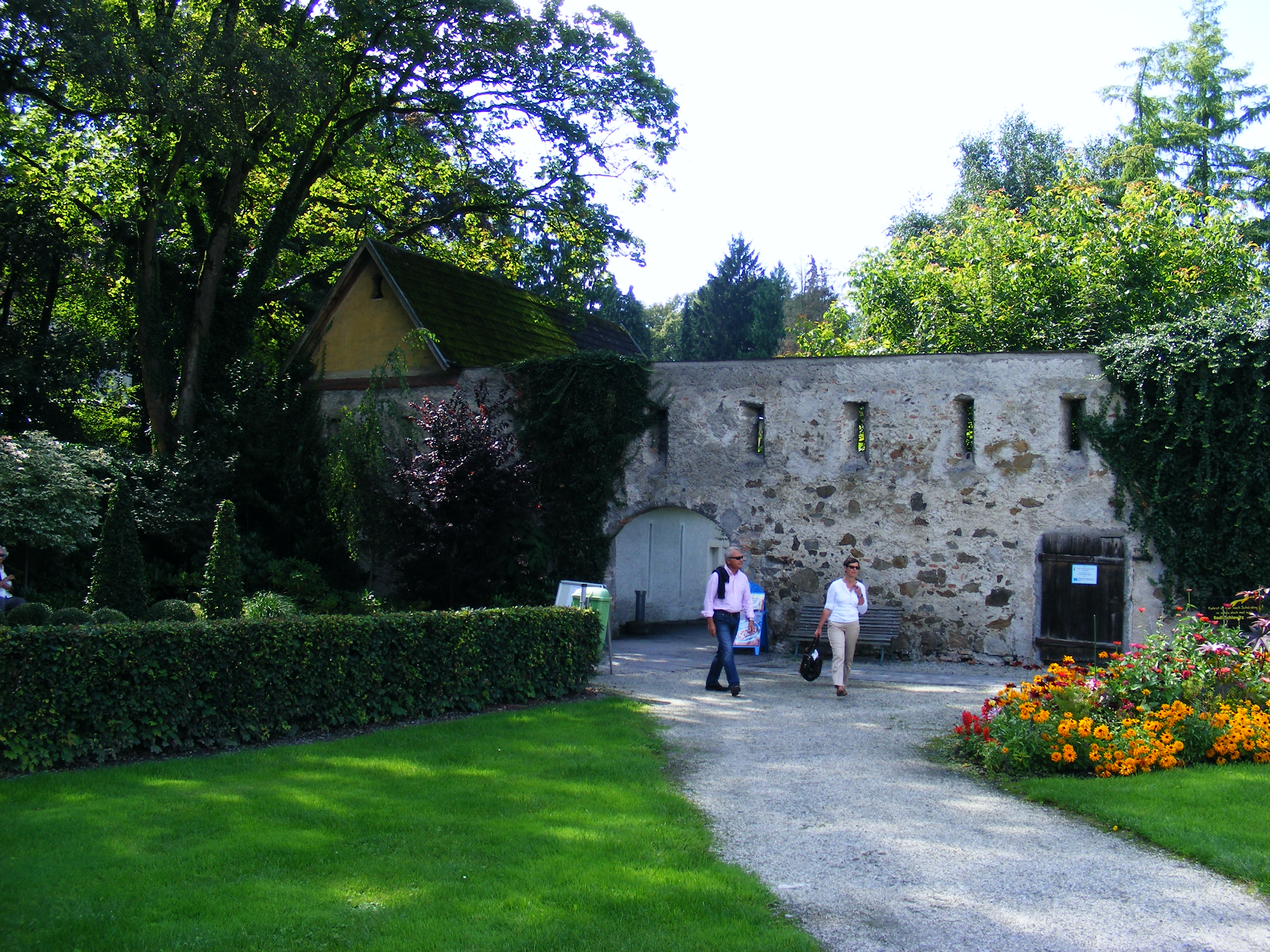
Schärding - Orangerie, Gebäude (westlich)

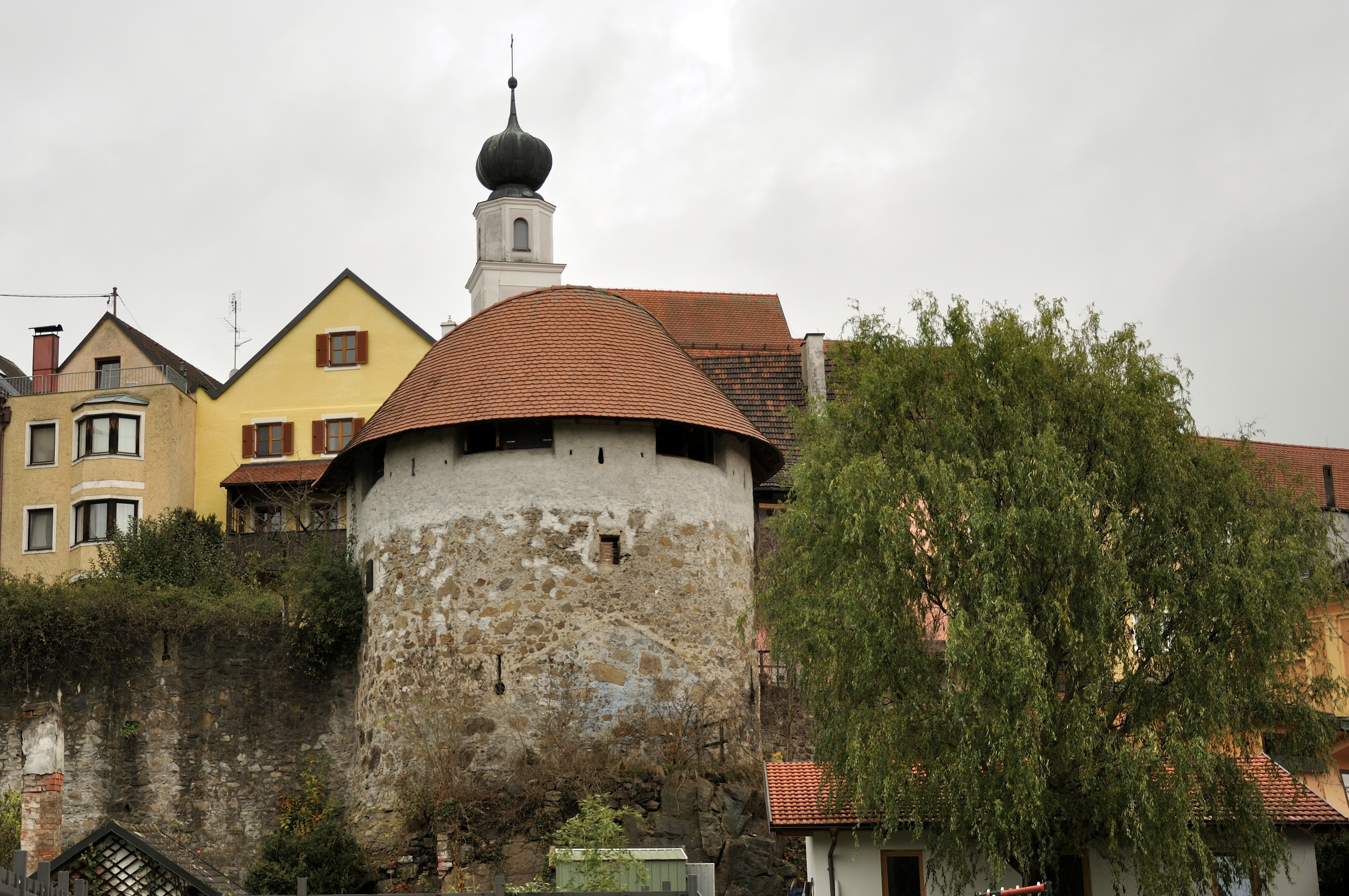
Schärding Befestigungsturm

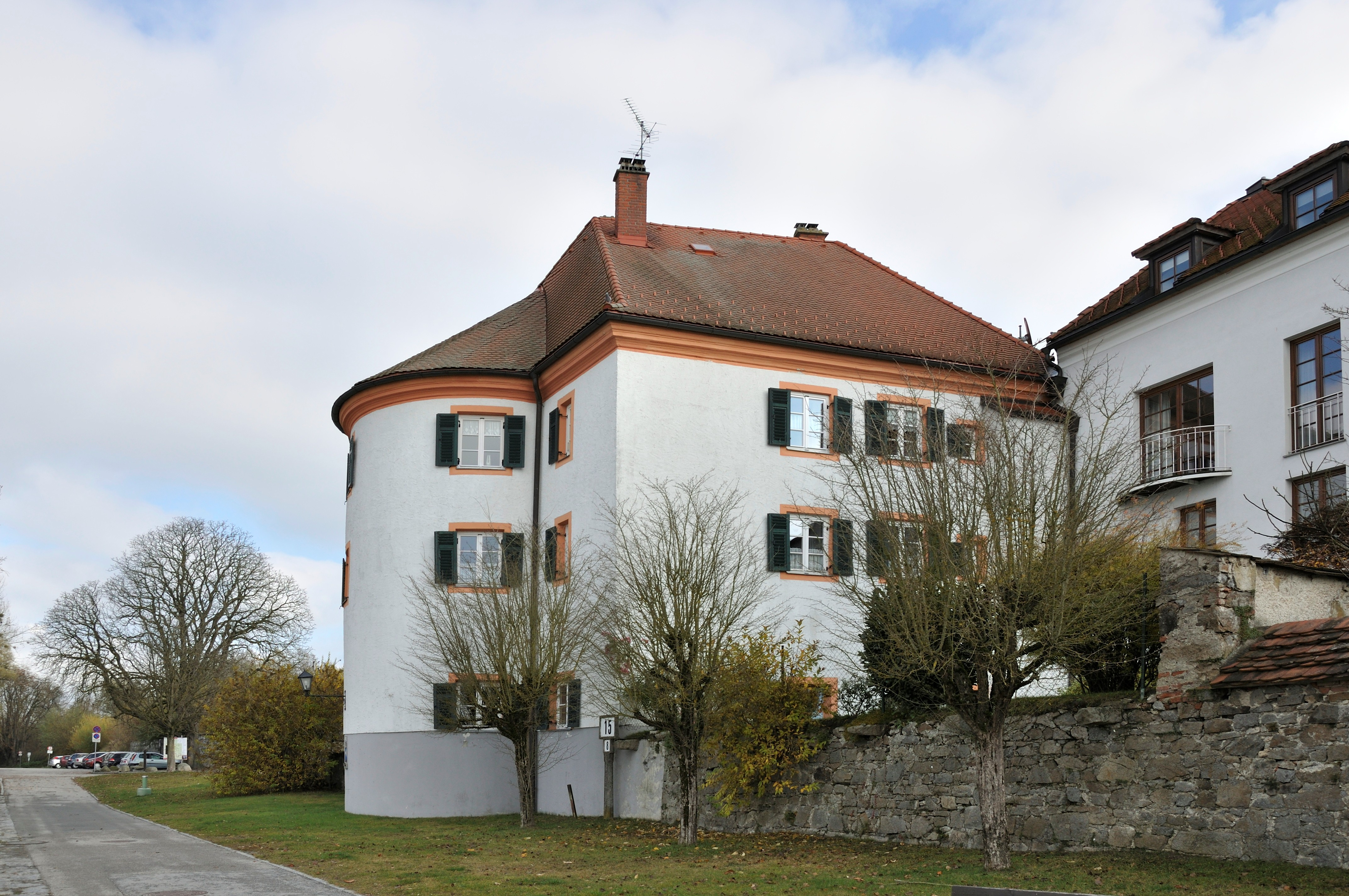
Schärding Götzturm Town walls

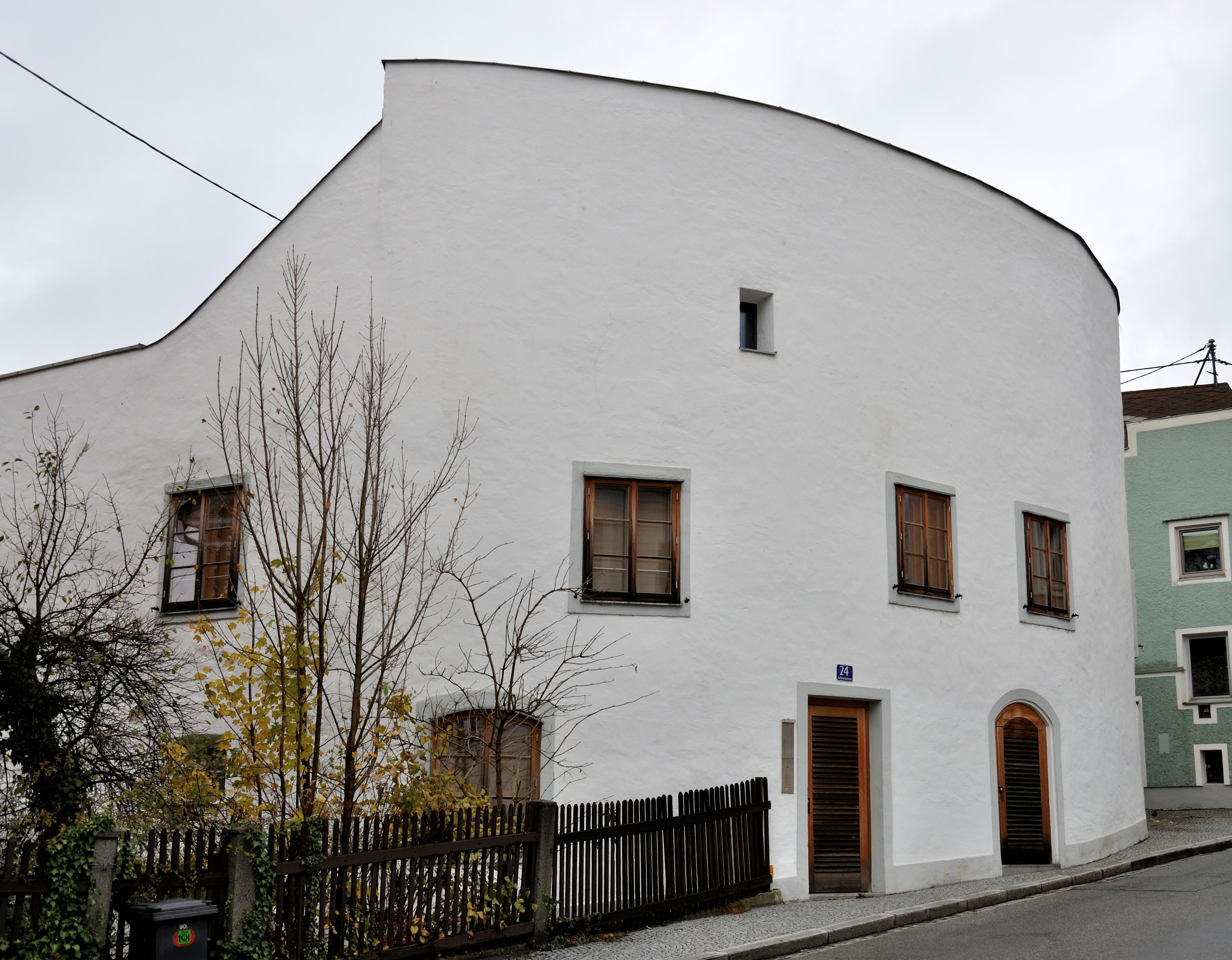
Schärding Innbruckstraße 24 Stadtturm

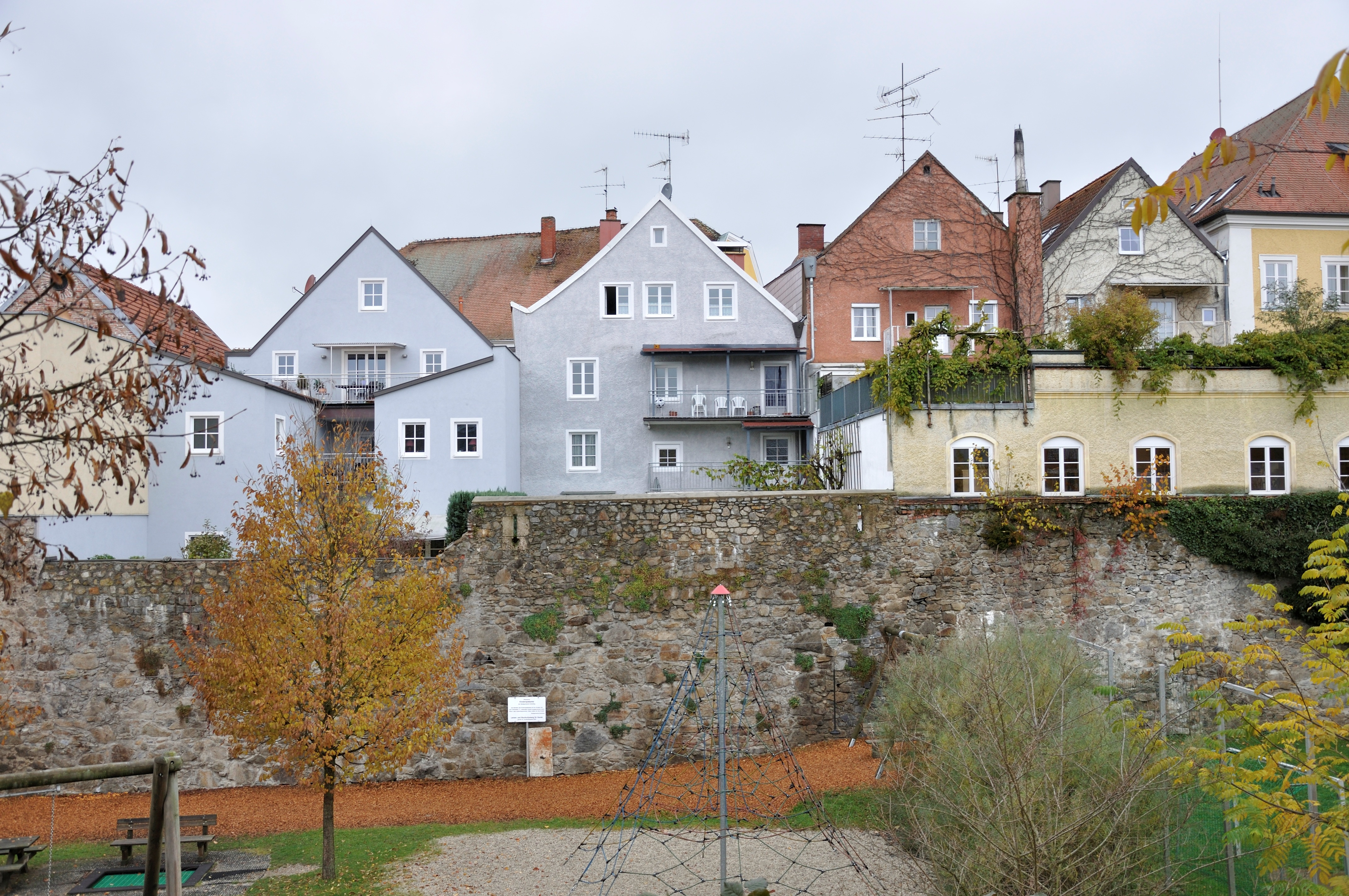
Schärding. Keyhole Gun Ports Ludwig Pfliegl Gasse

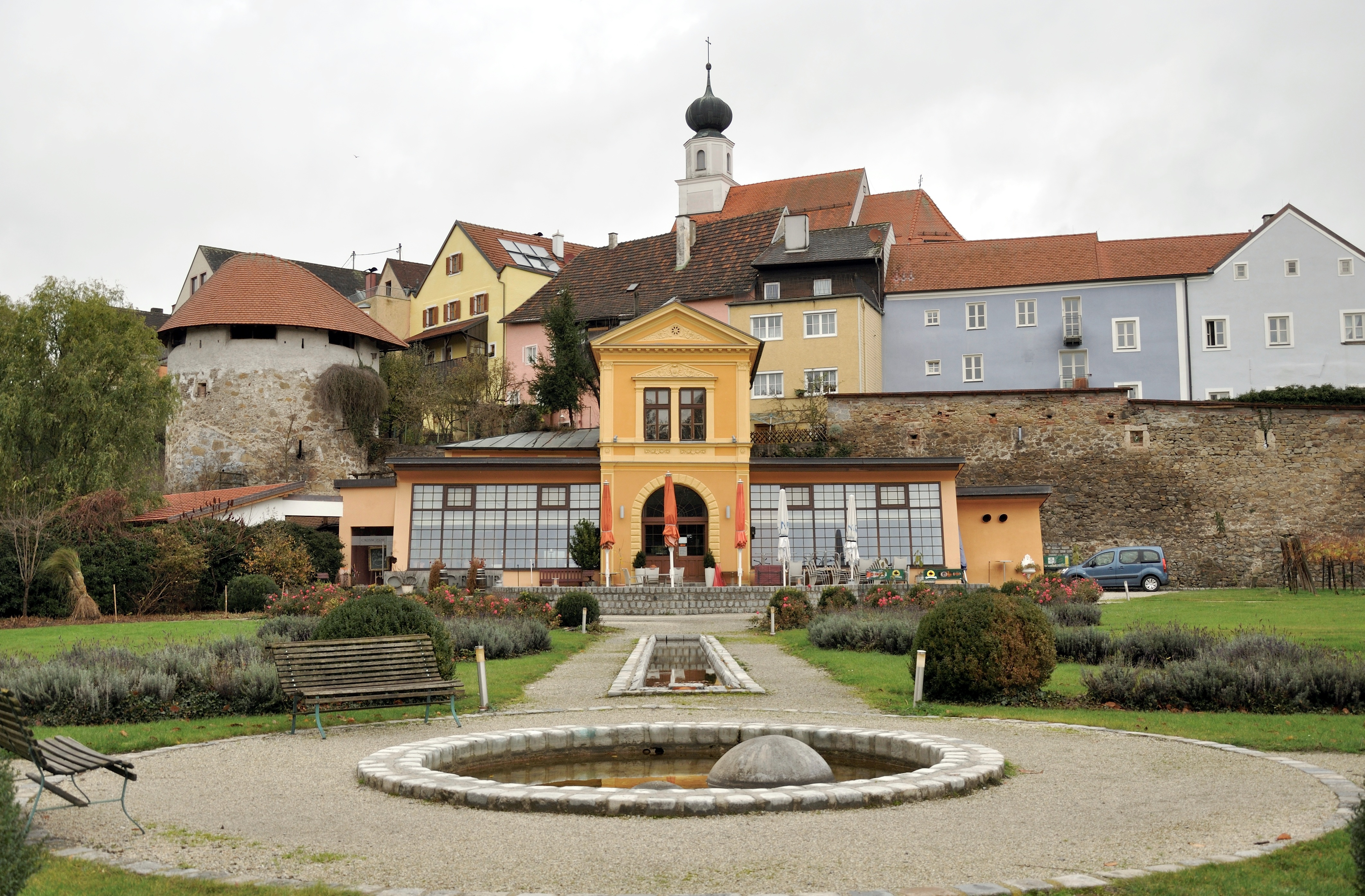
Schärding Orangerie Befestigungsturm

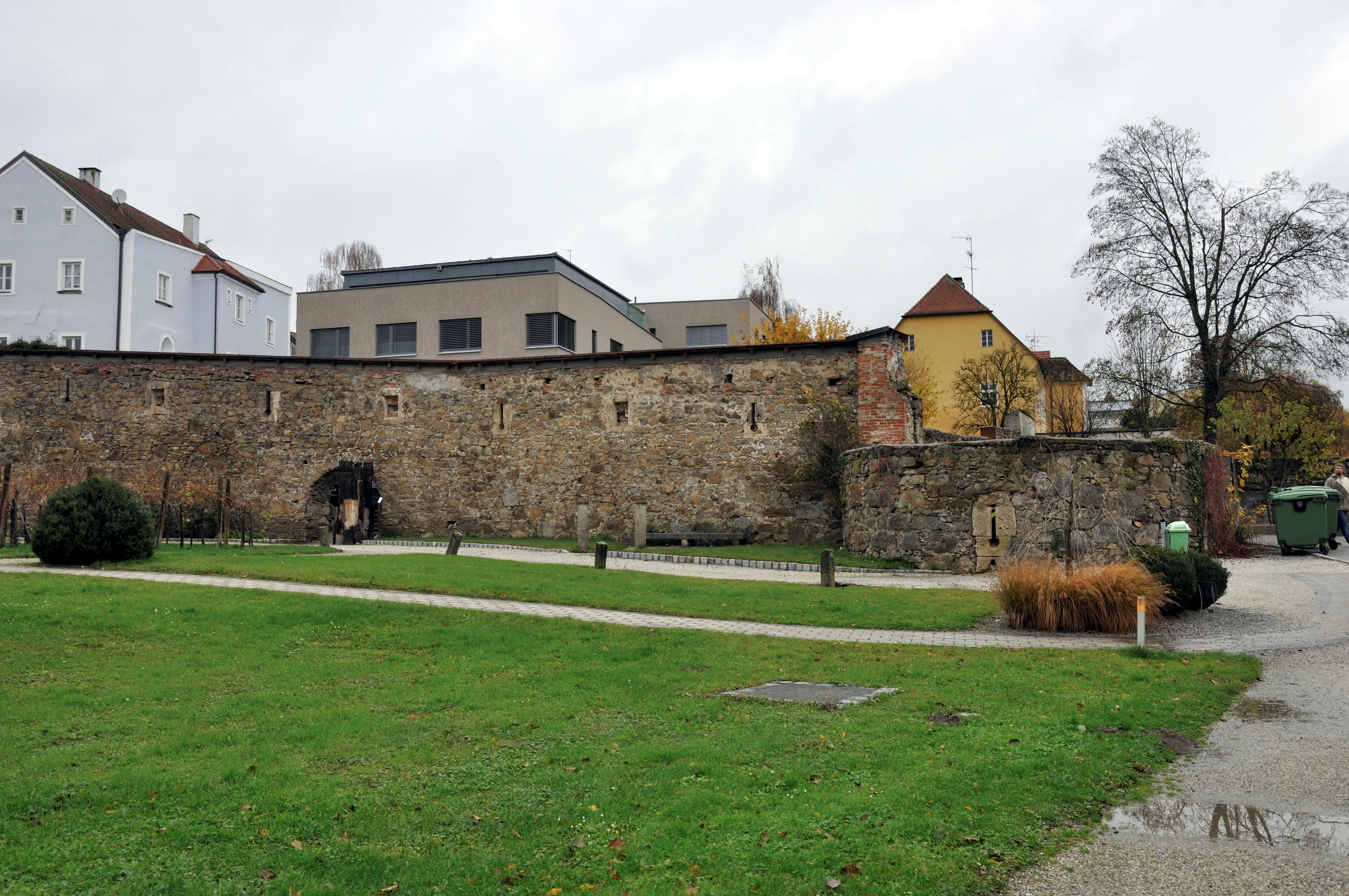
Schärding Stadtmauer außen frontal

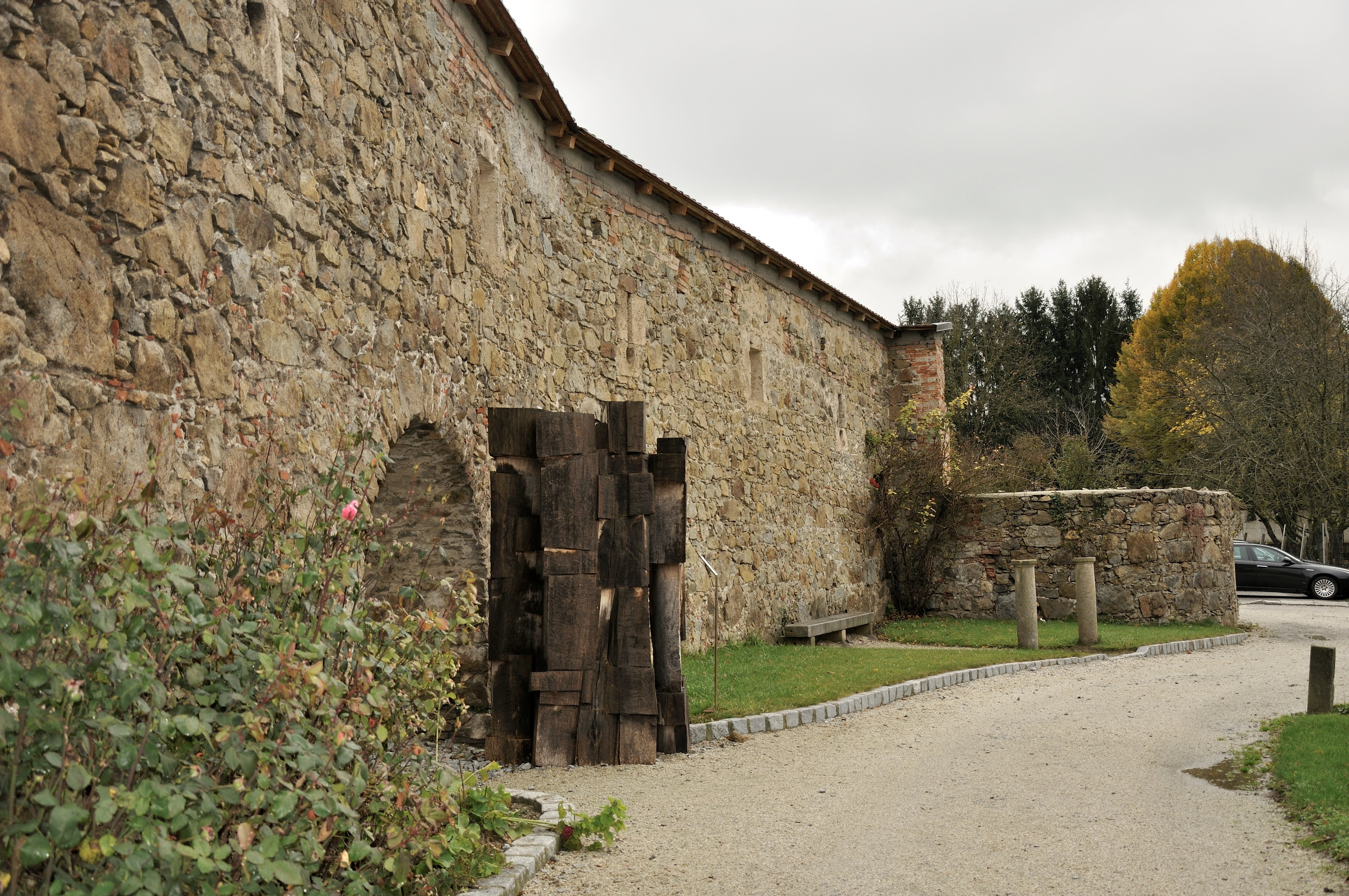
Schärding Stadtmauer GstNr 22 von außen
- Schwanenstadt was first mentioned as the Bavarian settlement ‘Suanse’ c. 790’ and as a market in 1361. An ovoid settlement with a long rectangular marketplace stretching almost from a gate-tower in the northeast to almost the gate-tower in the SE. The Vischer print of 1674 shows the settlement surrounded by a bank, surmounted by wooden palisade, with only a short length of wall adjacent to the S. gate. Some of these details can also be seen on Merian’s print of 1679. The only surviving evidence for the fortifications is the re-built Stadtturm (SW gate-tower).
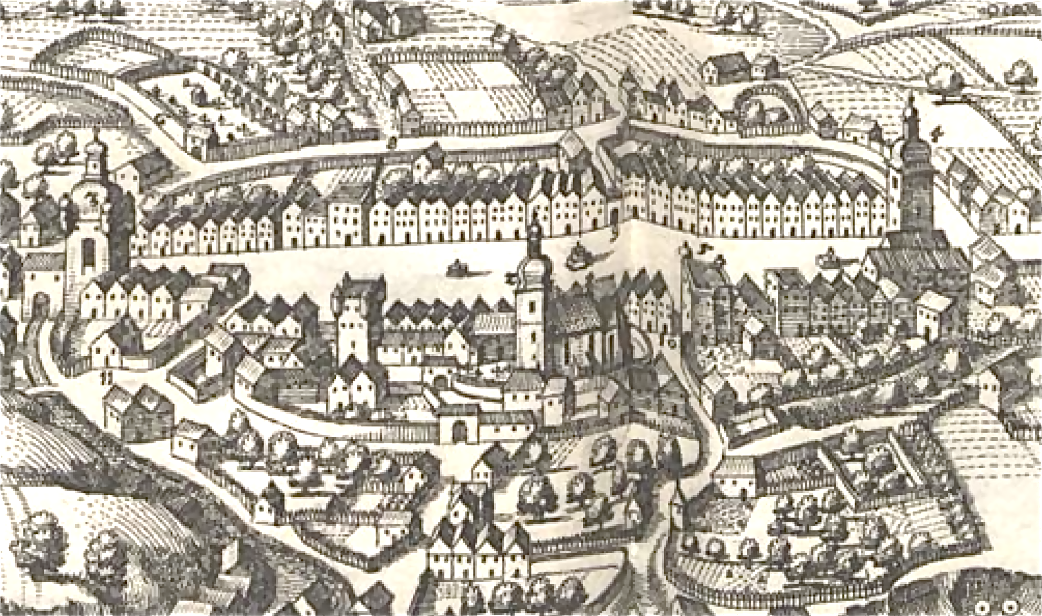
Schwanenstadt Matthäus Merian 1679

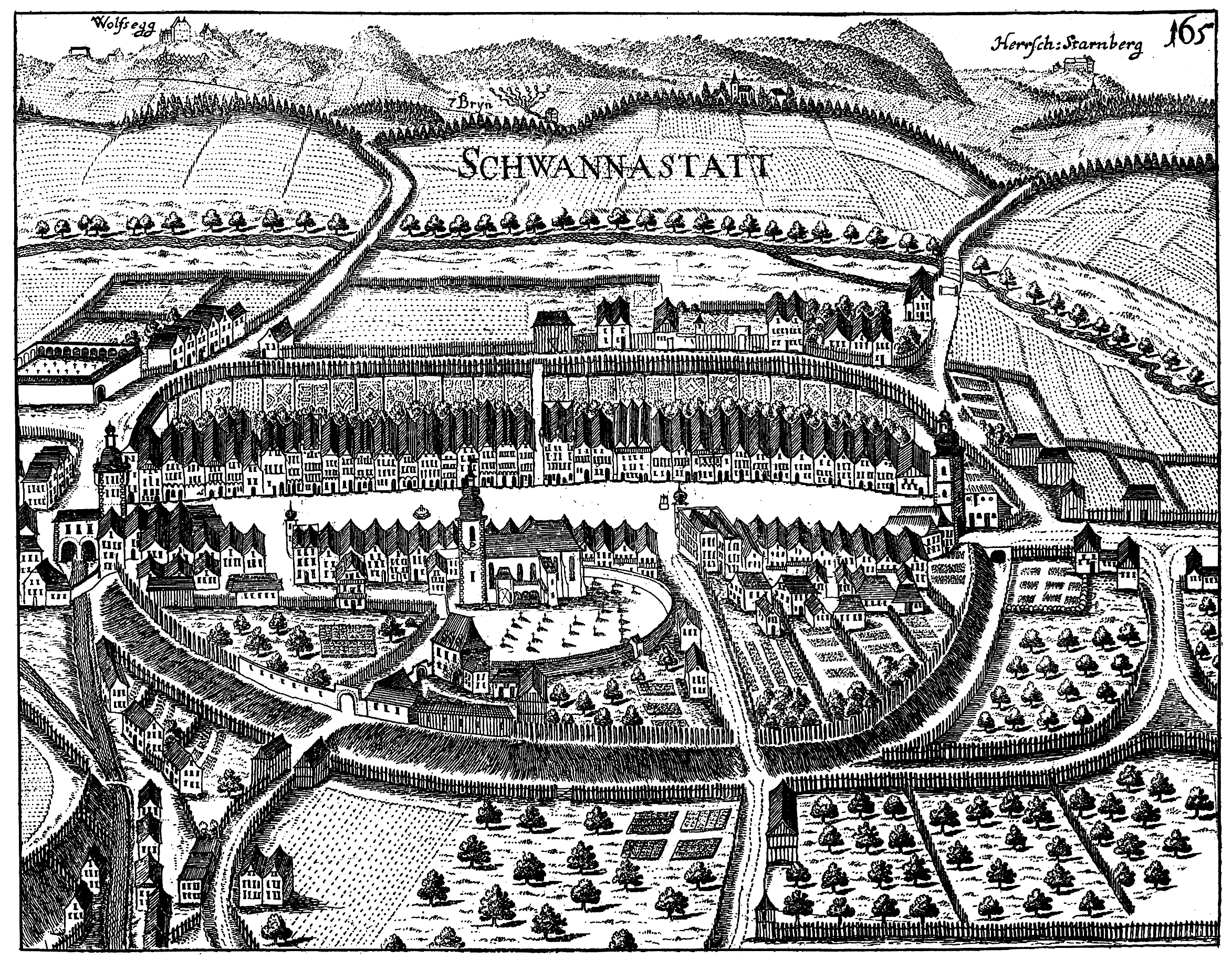
Schwanenstadt (Vischer)

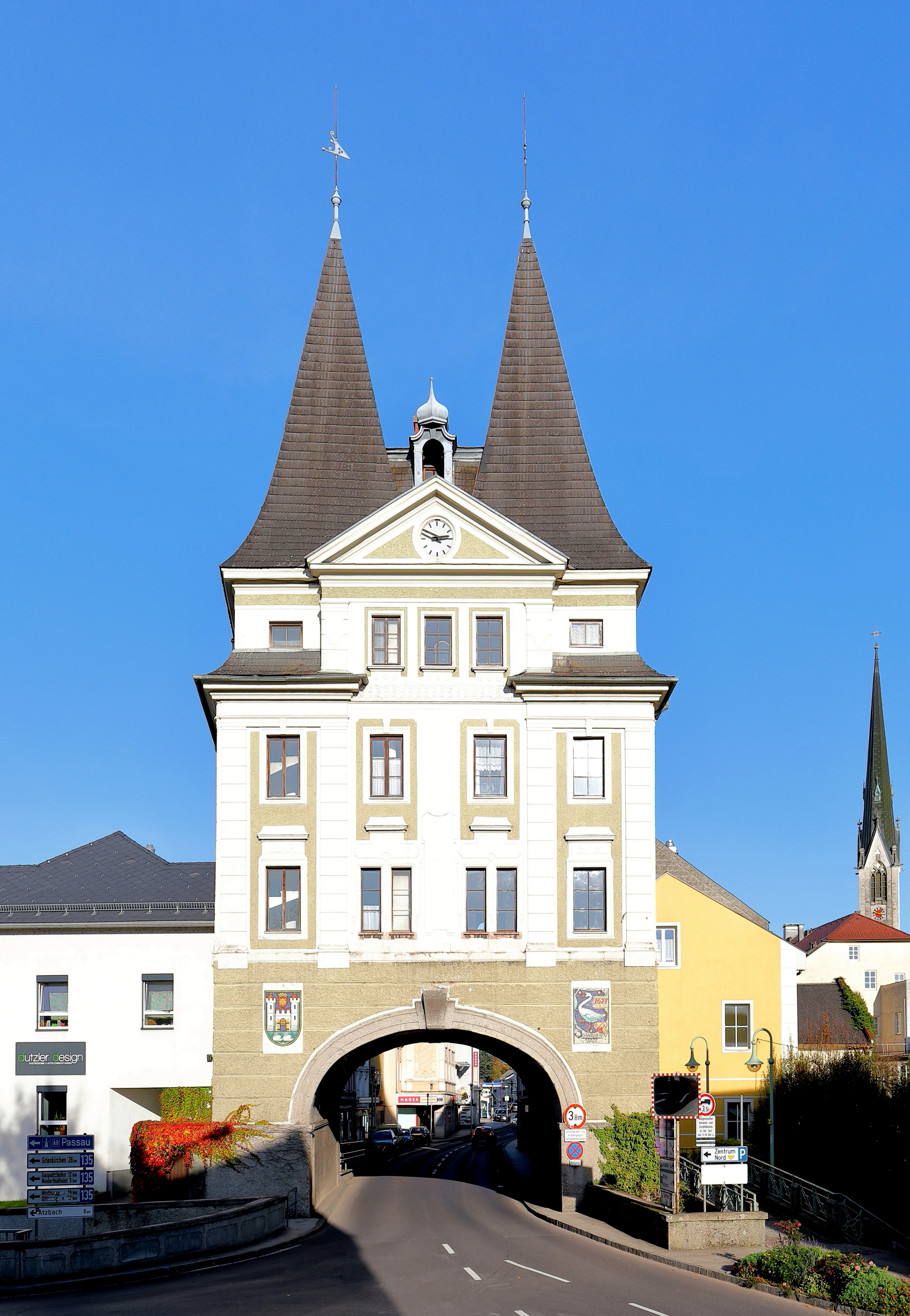
Schwanenstadt
- Steyr is situatuated at the confluences of the Enns and Steyr rivers, with a ridge of higher ground, the ‘Styraberg’; at the end of which, by the confluence, is the Lamberg castle. The Lamberg was the original settlement and together with the Ennsberg, was fortified around 900 AD to resist the Magyars. The site of the medieval walled town, with its spindle-shaped marketplace, was placed on a narrow strip between the ridge and the river Enns. The town was first mentioned in 1170 and there is one surviving gatetower, the Neutor.
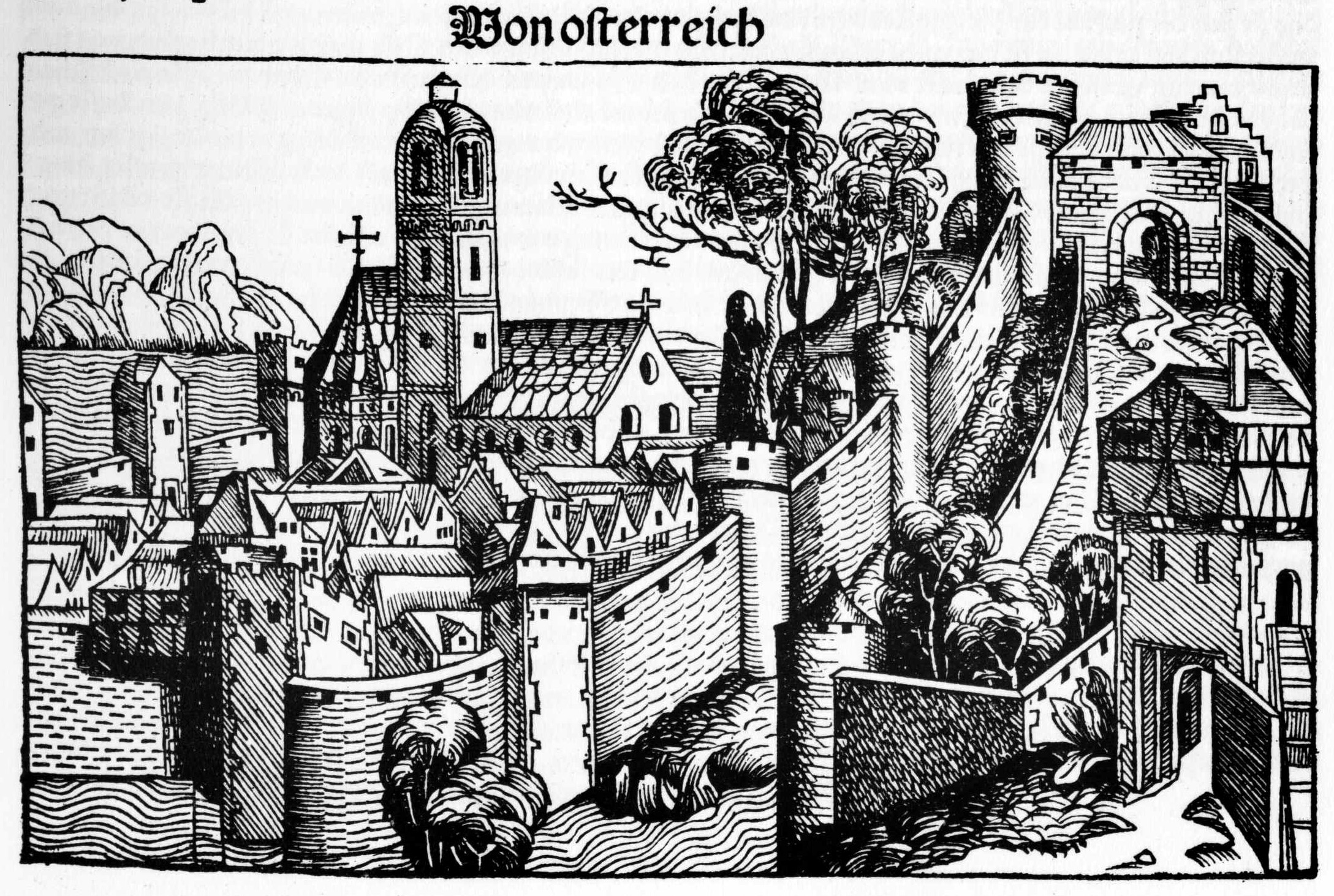
Schedelsche Weltchronik - Steyr

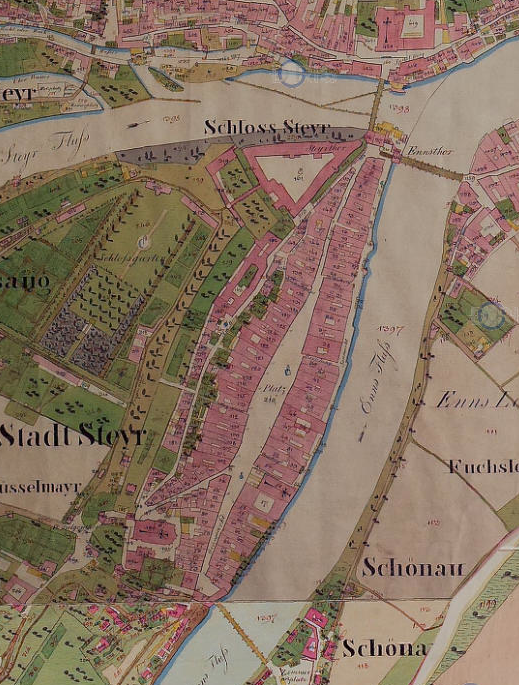
Steyr. Upper Austria. Franziszeische Landesaufnahme 2nd Military Survey c. 1835

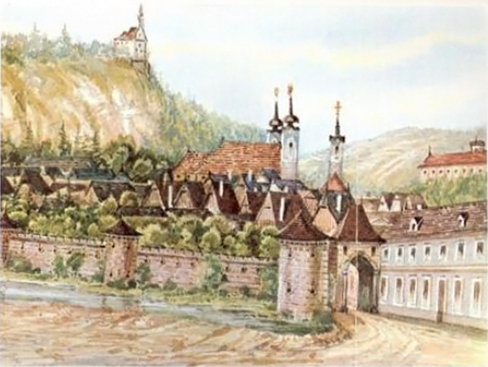
Franz Hölzlhuber - Wieserfeld 1840

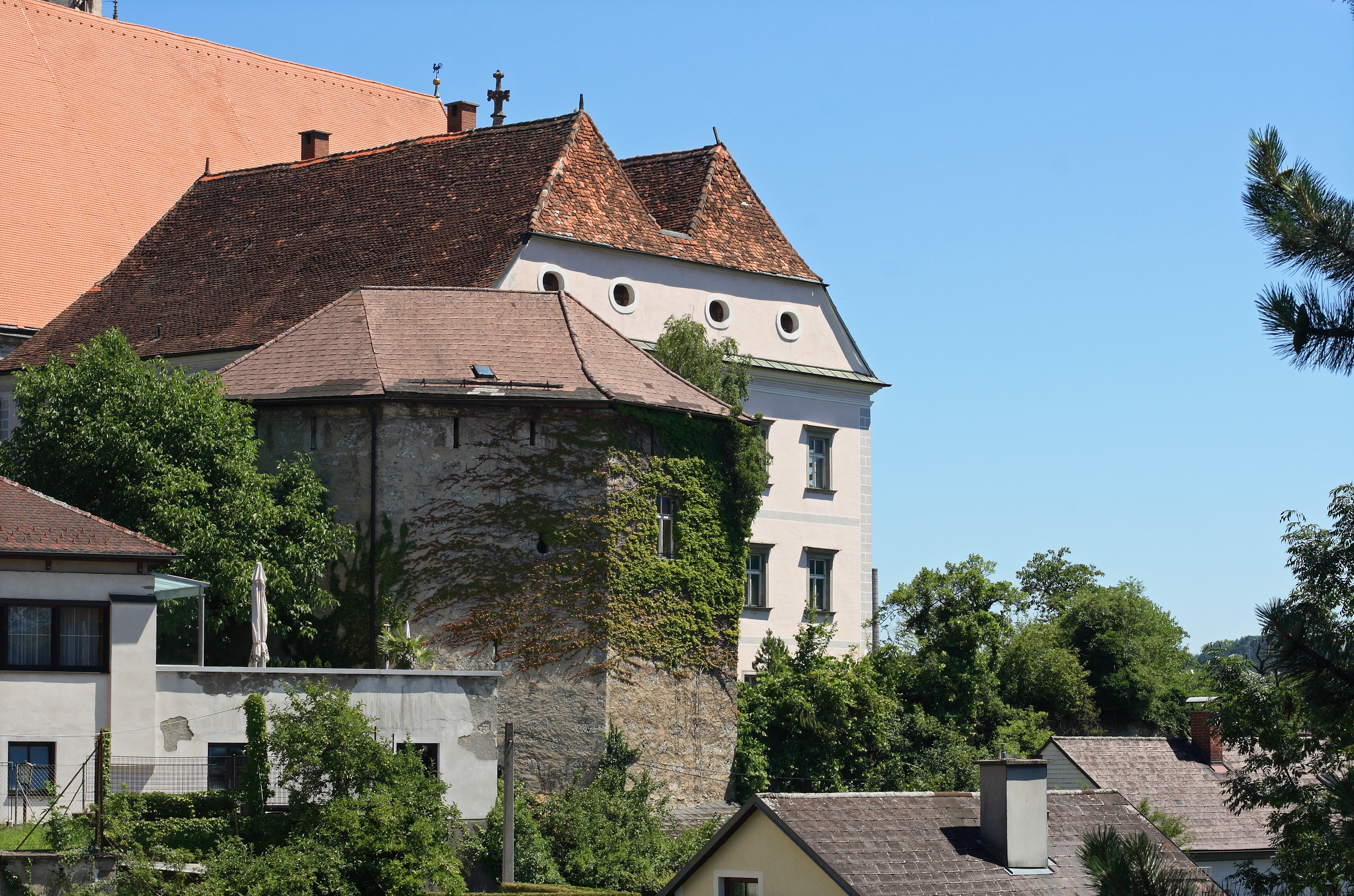
Stadt walls and Alter Pfarrhof, Steyr

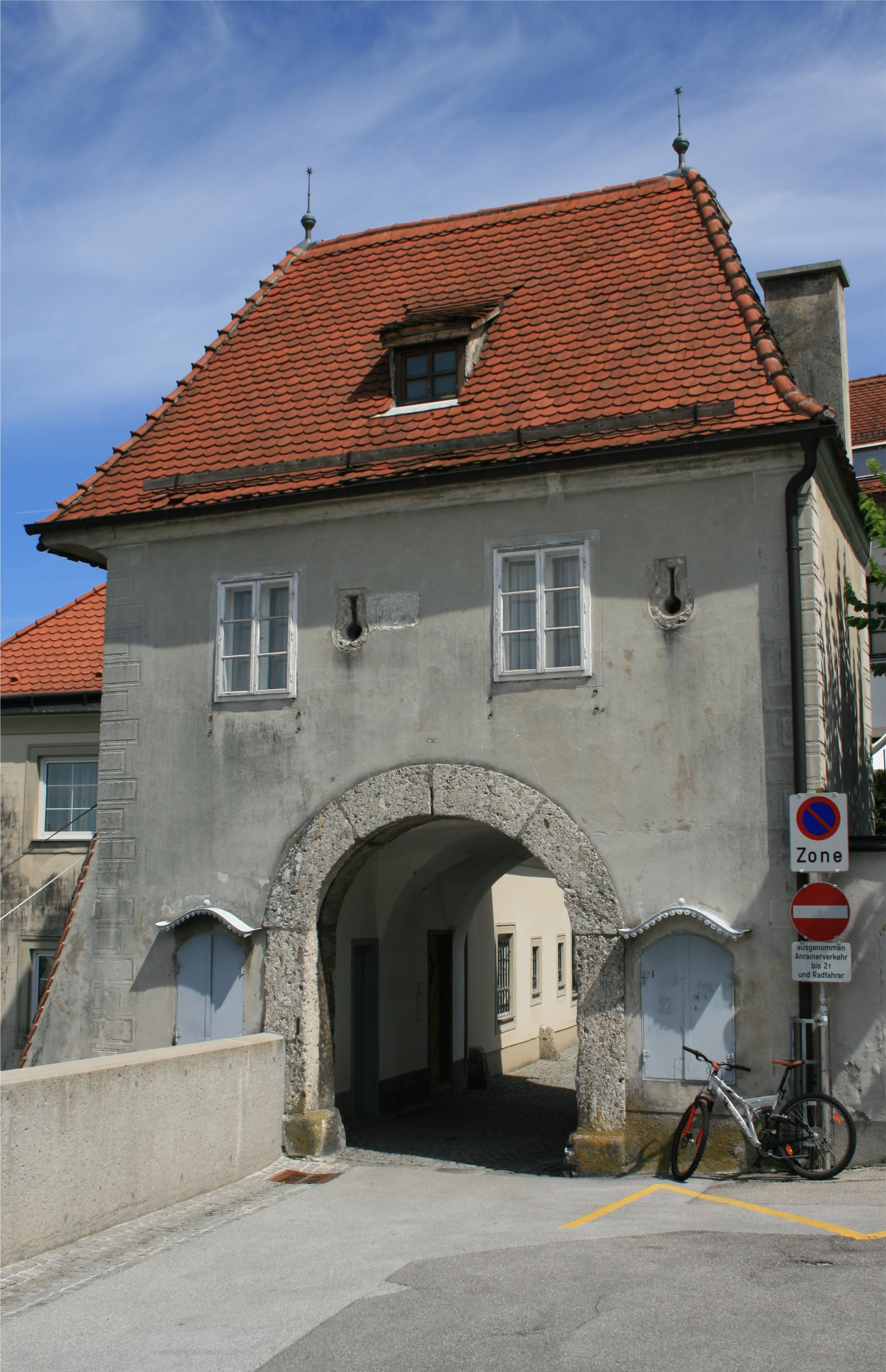
Kollertor

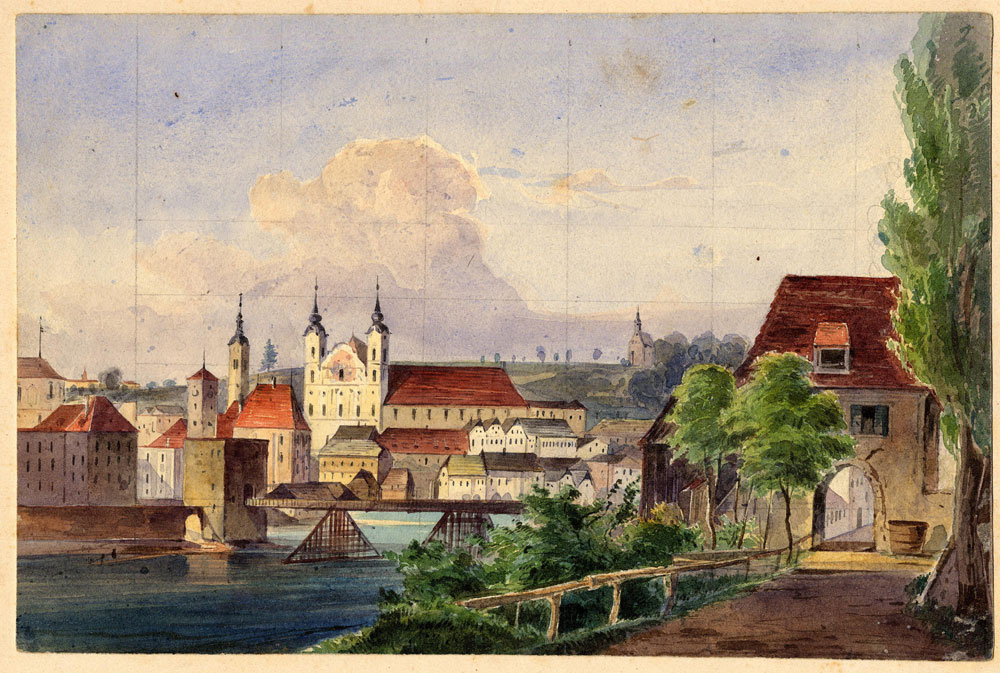
Steyr 19th century watercolour

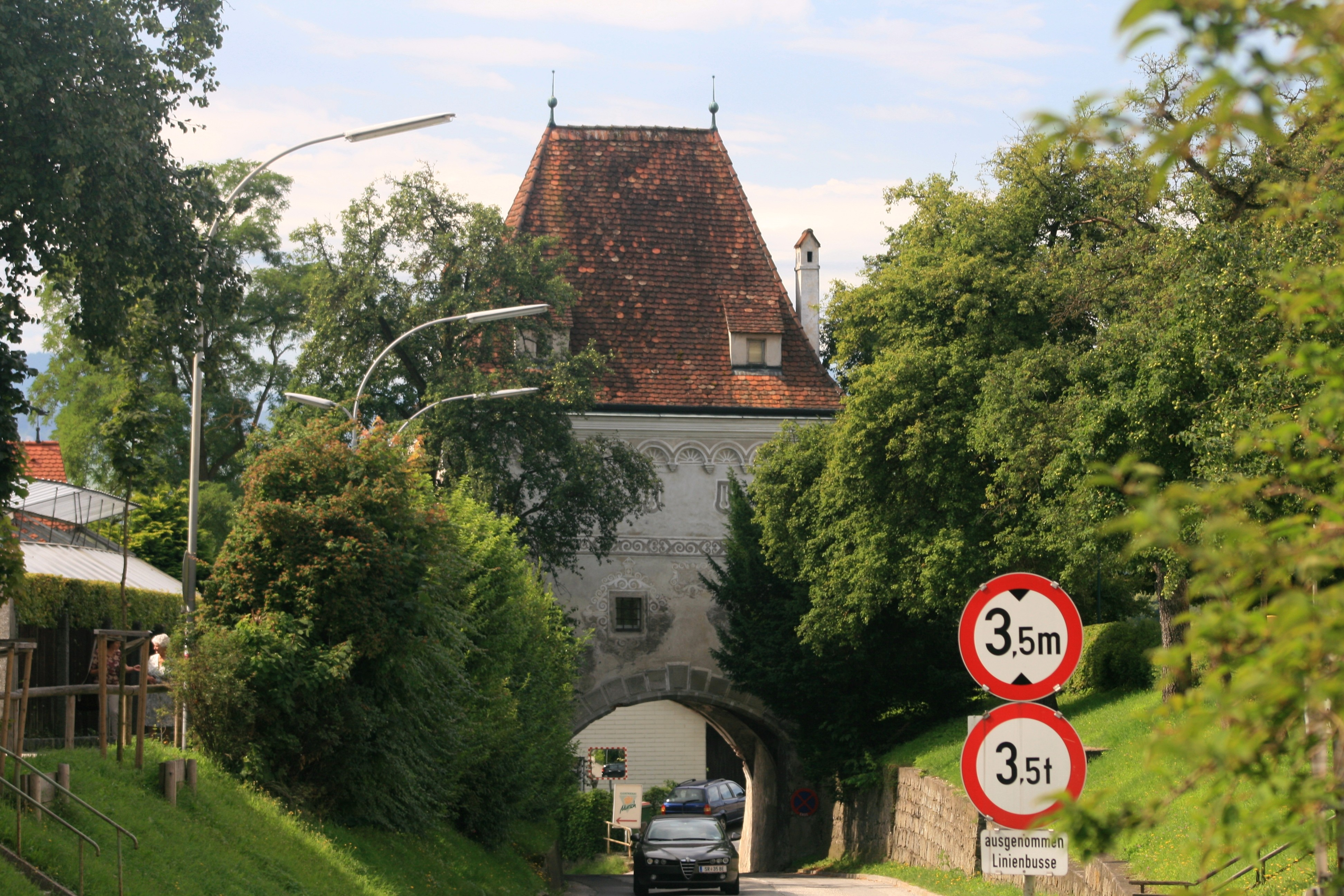
Schnallentor

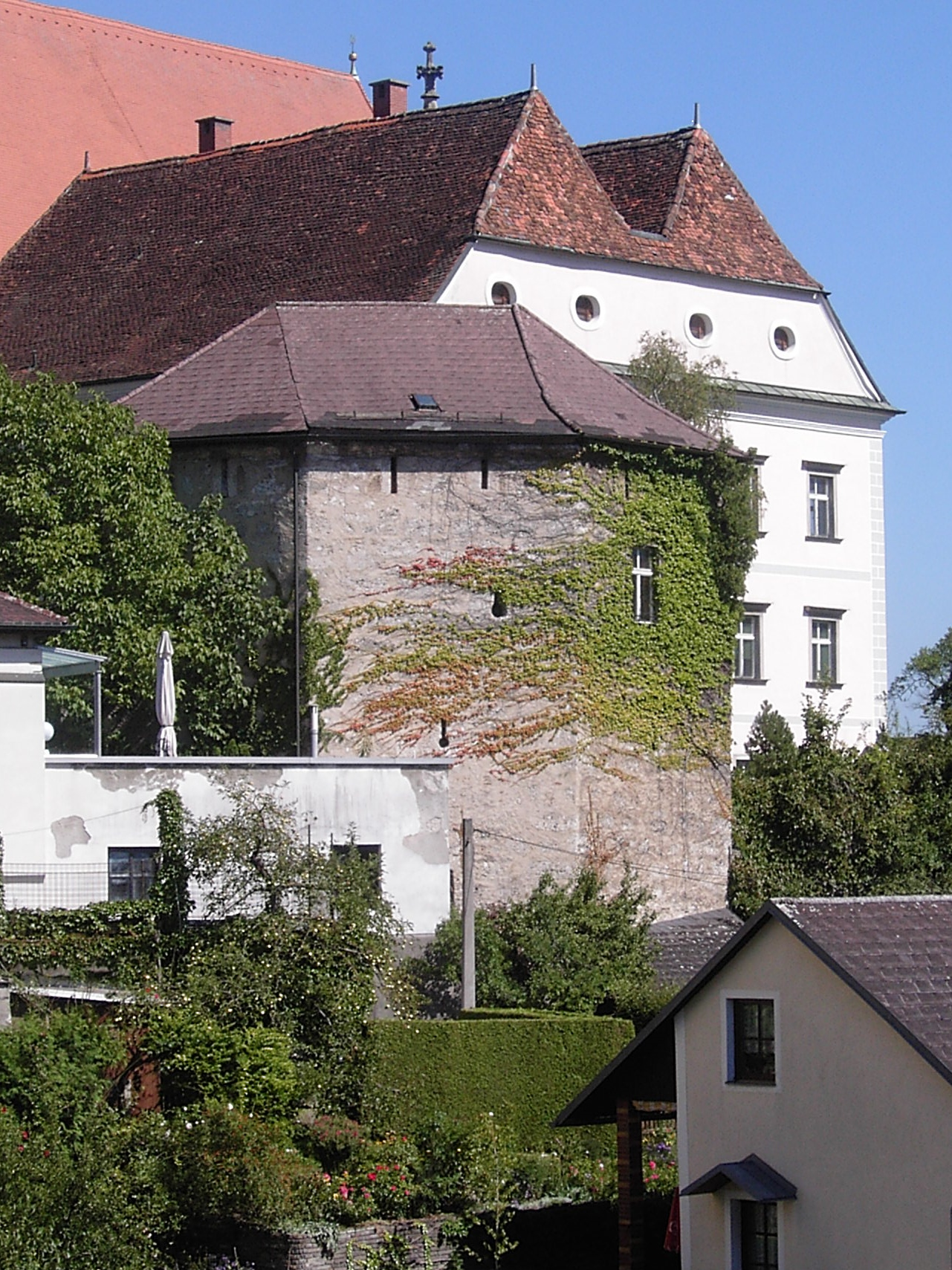
Steyr Town walls

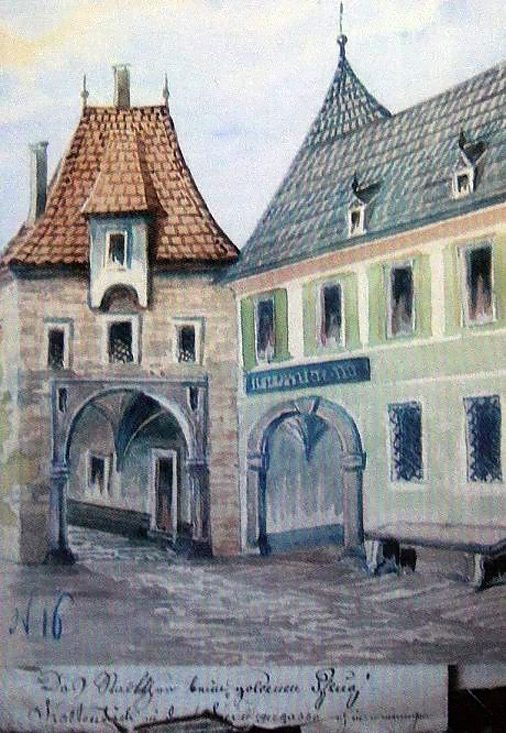
Franz Hölzlhuber - Frauentor

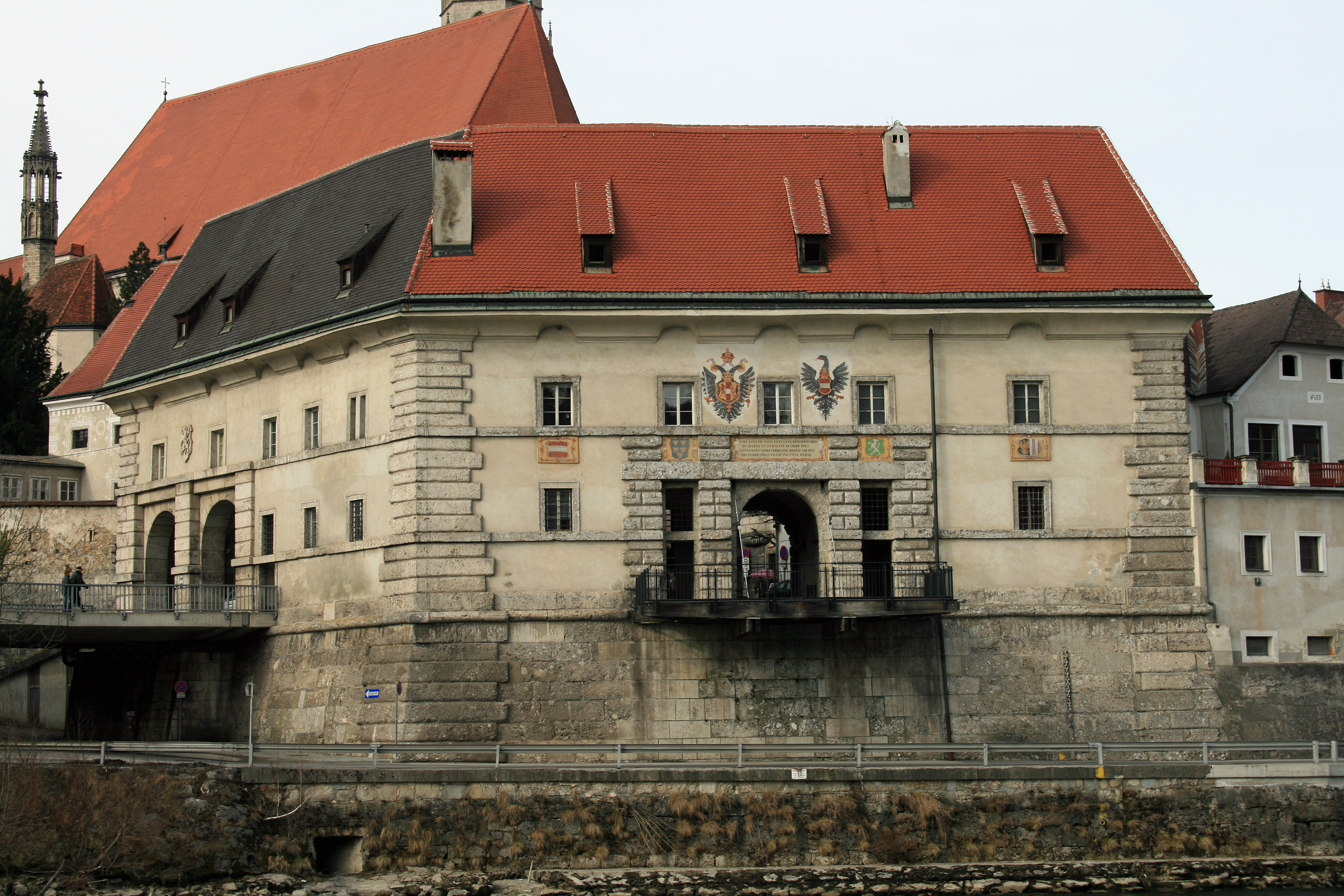
Neutor in Steyr

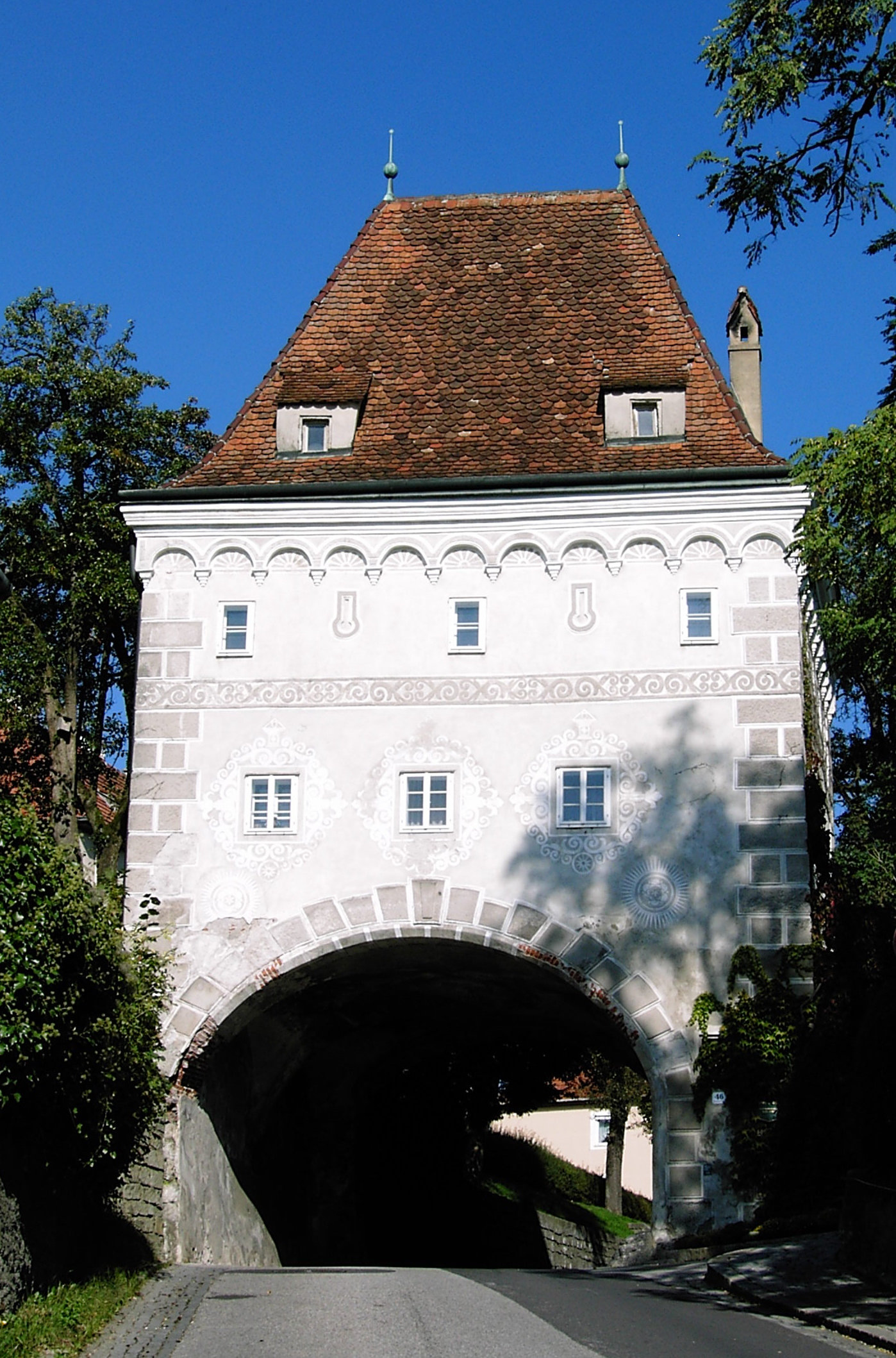
Steyr Gleinker Gasse

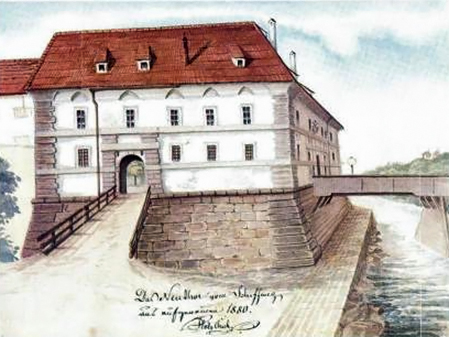
Franz Hölzelhuber - Steyrer Neutor
- Steyregg was mentioned in 885 as ‘Tabersheim’ and there is the first mention of a castle in 1150, held between 1238 and 1280 by the Kuenringer family, who founded towns in Lower Austria. The town, which was granted a charter in 1482, was roughly rectangular and was laid out below the castle along the Danube. The prints by Merian and Vischer show three gate-towers and a long rectangular marketplace. The gate-towers have been demolished and only fragments of the walls survive.
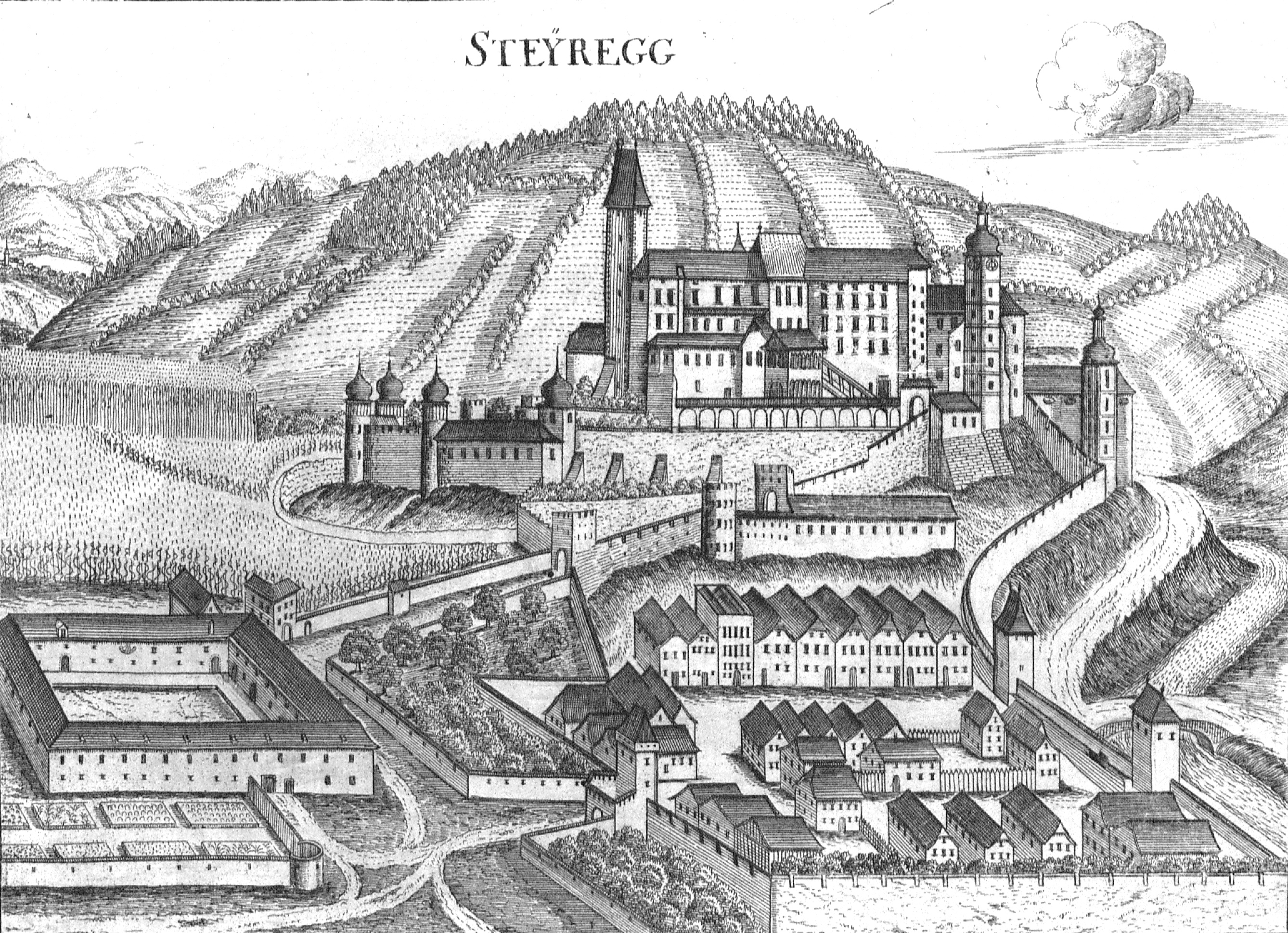
Steyregg Vischer 1674

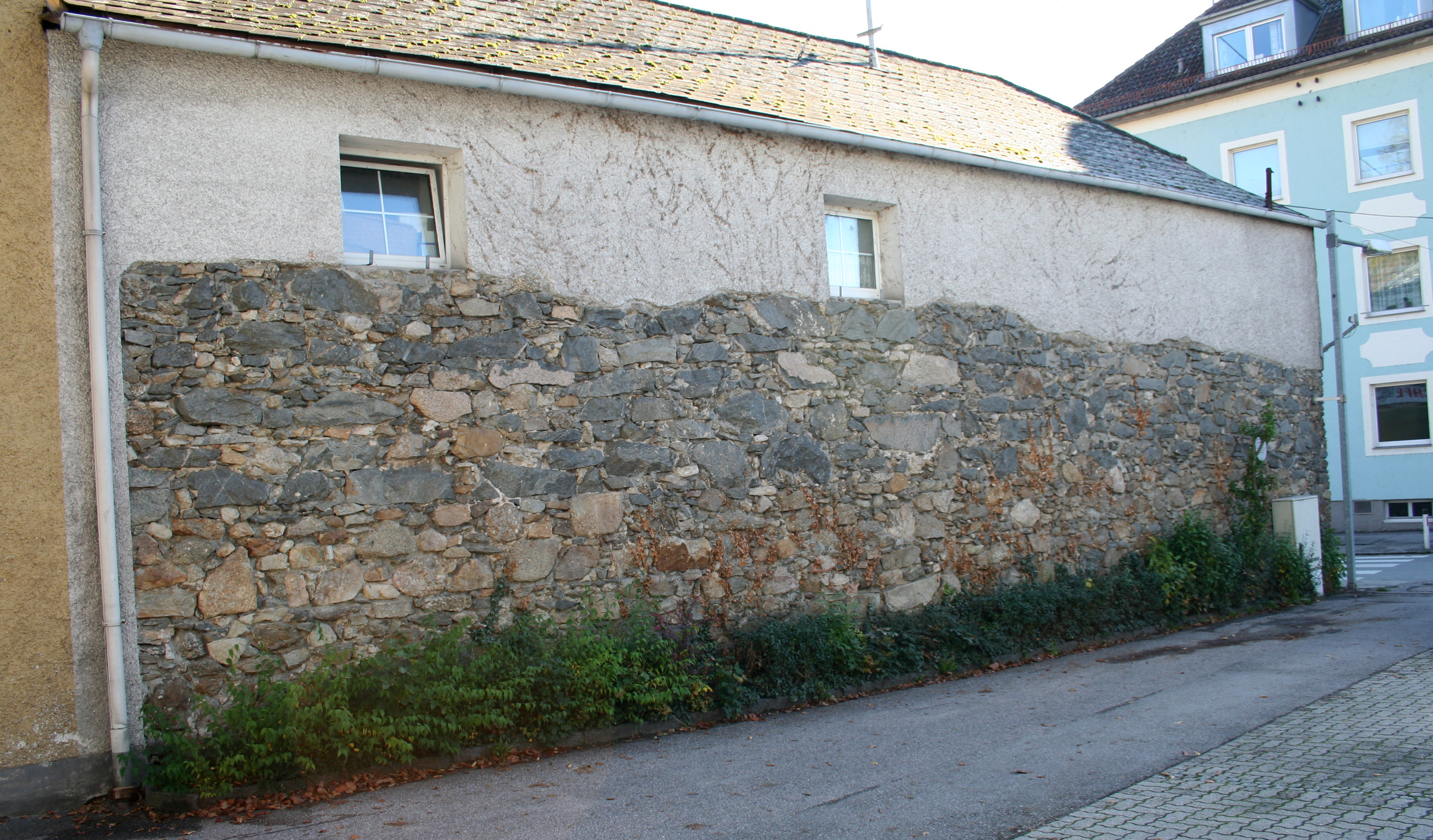
Town walls Steyregg

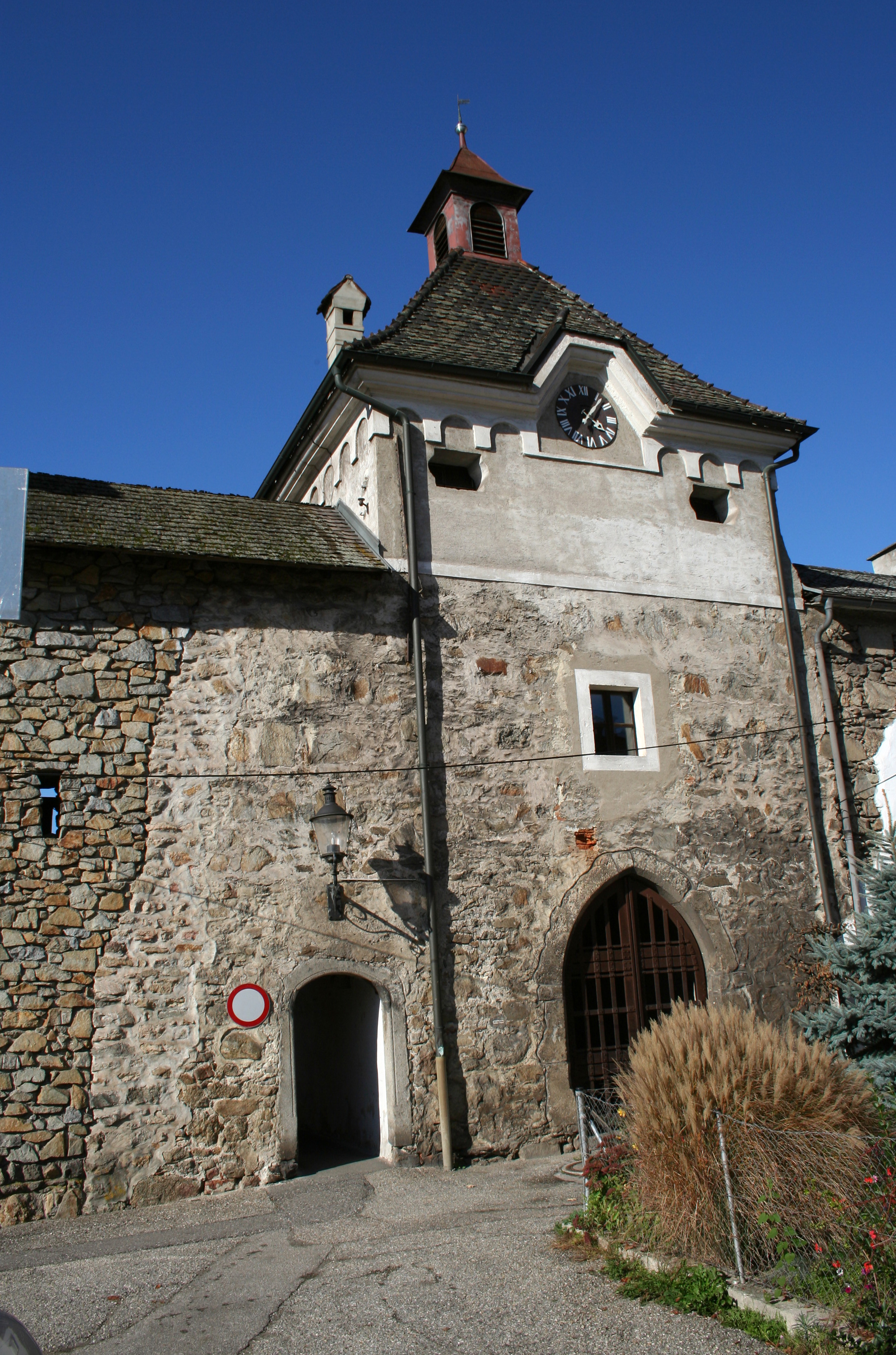
Seilertor-Steyregg

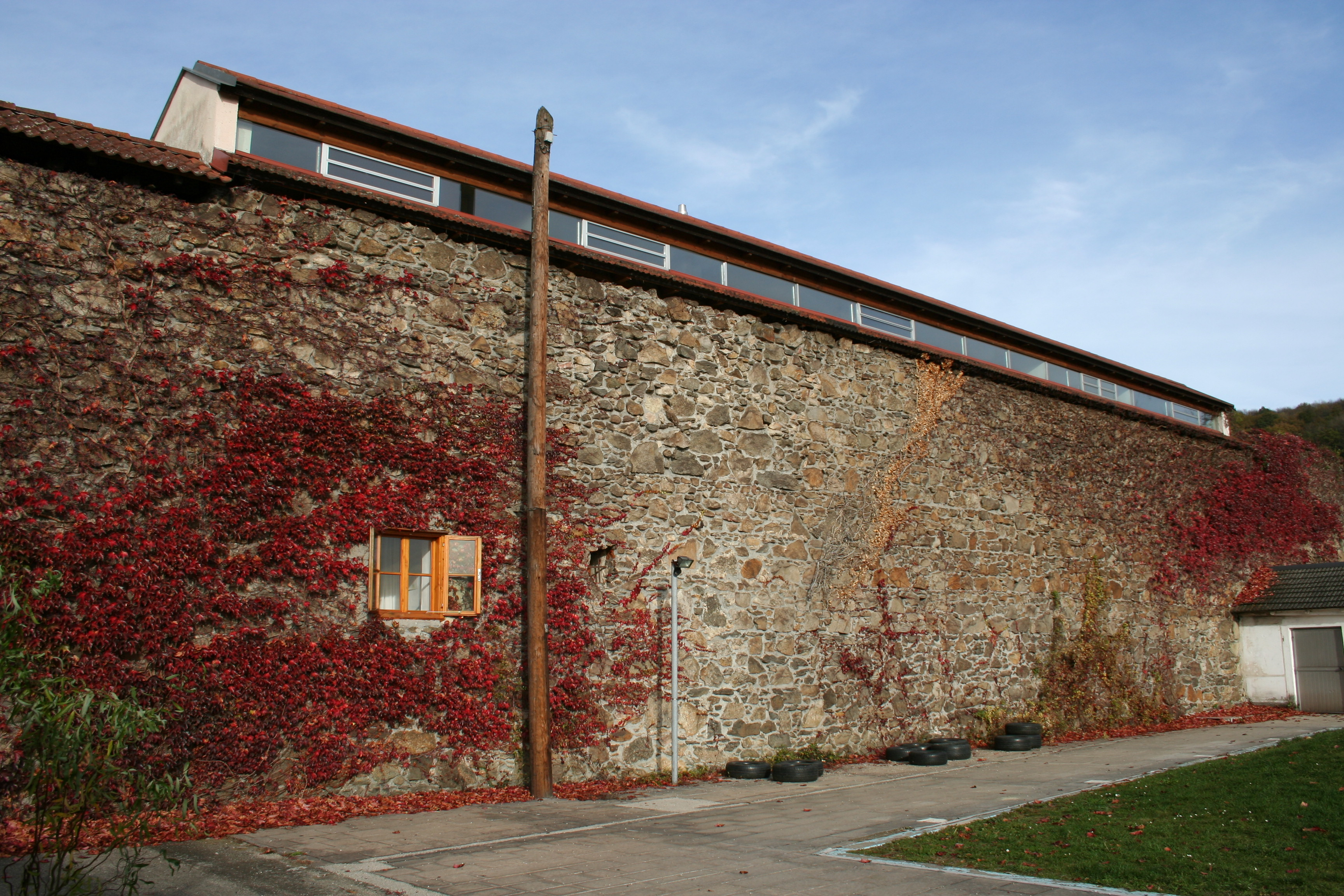
Town walls Steyregg

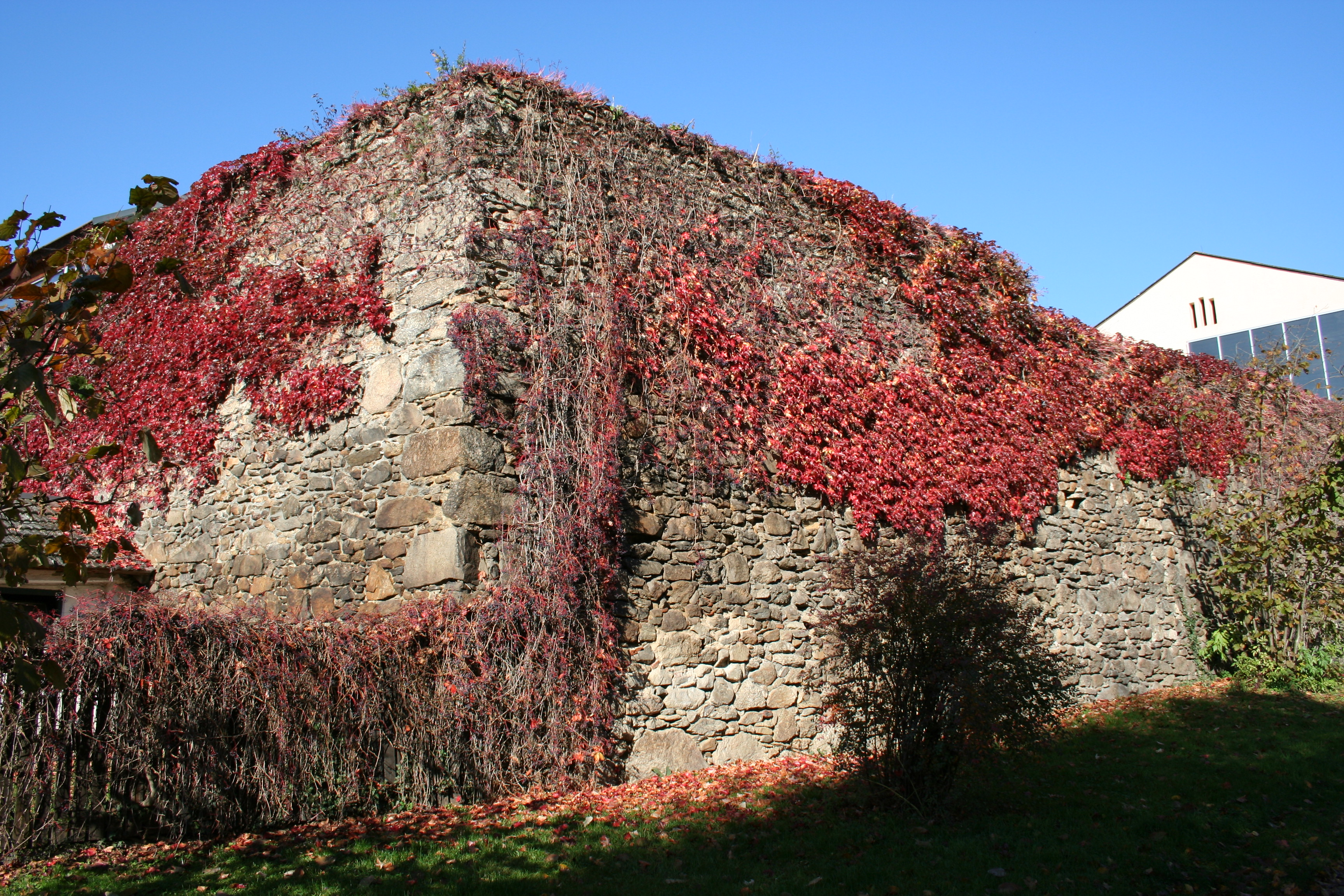
Town walls Steyregg

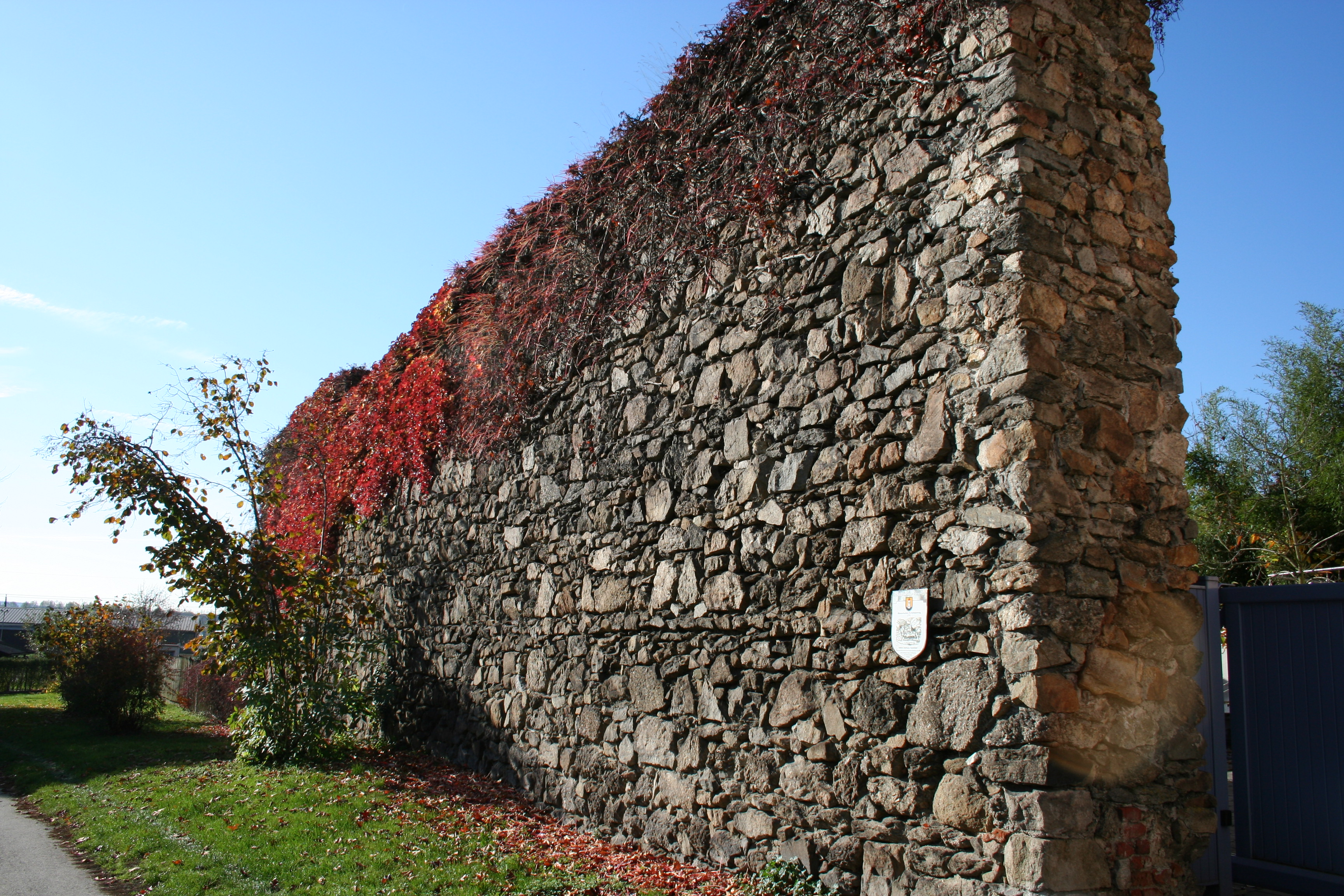
Town walls Steyregg

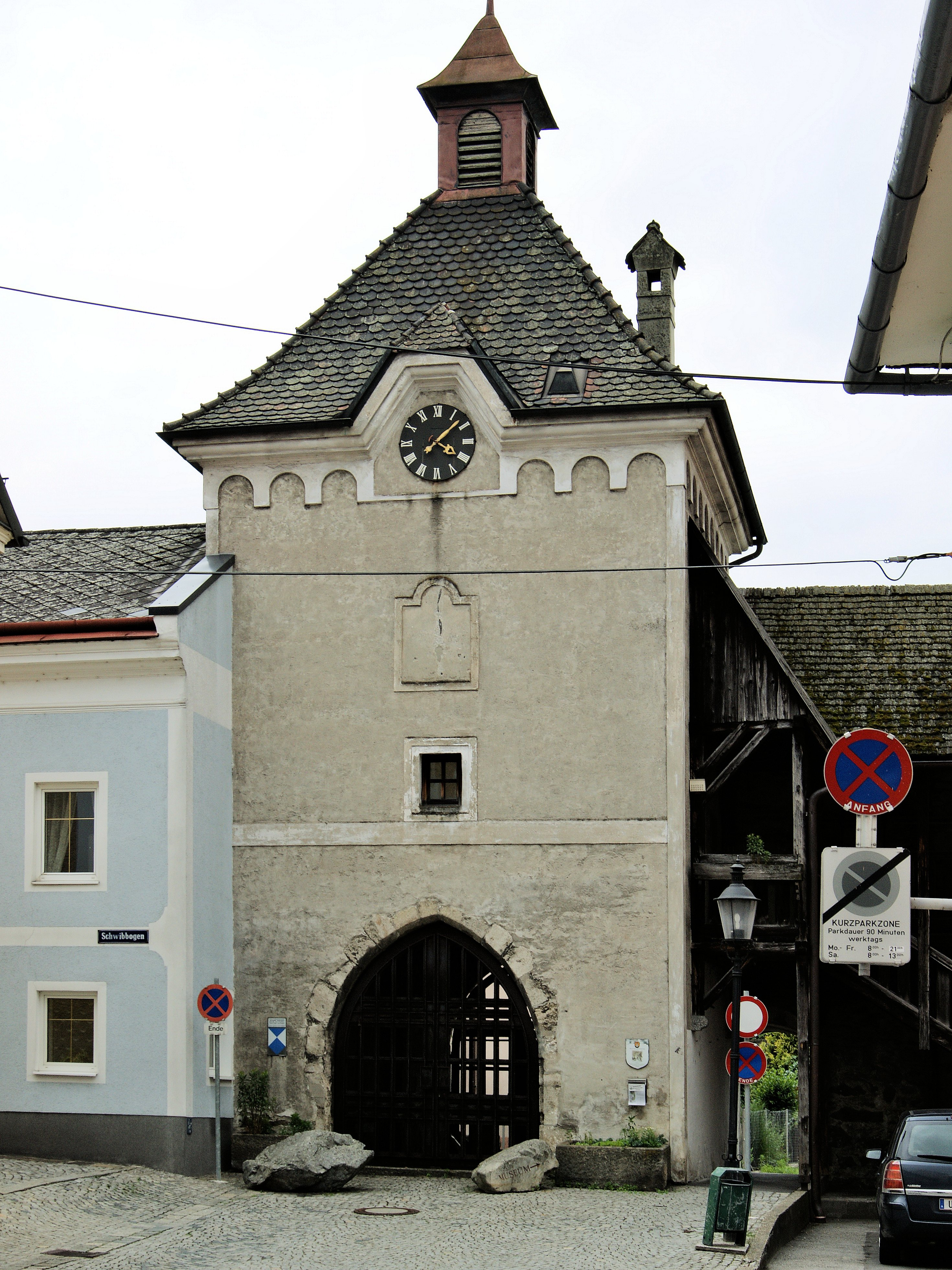
Stadttor Steyregg
- Vöcklabruck was first mentioned in 1134 as ‘Pons Veckelahe’. The surviving gate tower leads to the bridge over the river Vöckla. The wall enclosed a long rectangular marketplace, which almost extended to the western gatetower.
- Wels was originally a Roman ‘Municipium’ and ‘Ovilava’ founded by Emperor Hadrian and given ‘Colonia’ status by Emperor Caracalla. In the 6th century the Bavarians had established themselves in the area and in 726 a ‘castrum uueles’ is mentioned. The fortified settlement was in the southern portion of the Roman defences, but a suburb developed to the North with the ‘oberes markt’ a long rectangular marketplace, and this was still within the area of the Roman enclosure. Matthäus Merian produced a detailed print of Wels in 1649, and a slightly altered copy of this was included in Vischer’s Upper Austria in 1674. Two towers still exist, the Wasserturm, which faces the river Traun, and the Ledererturm to the west, which was first mentioned in 1326. Both these towers are on the line of the Roman wall.
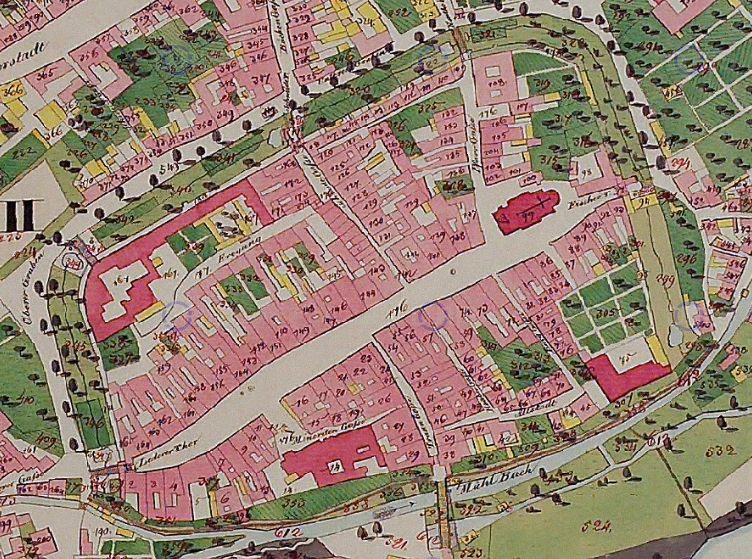
Wels, Franziszeische Landesaufnahme, 2nd Military Survey c1835

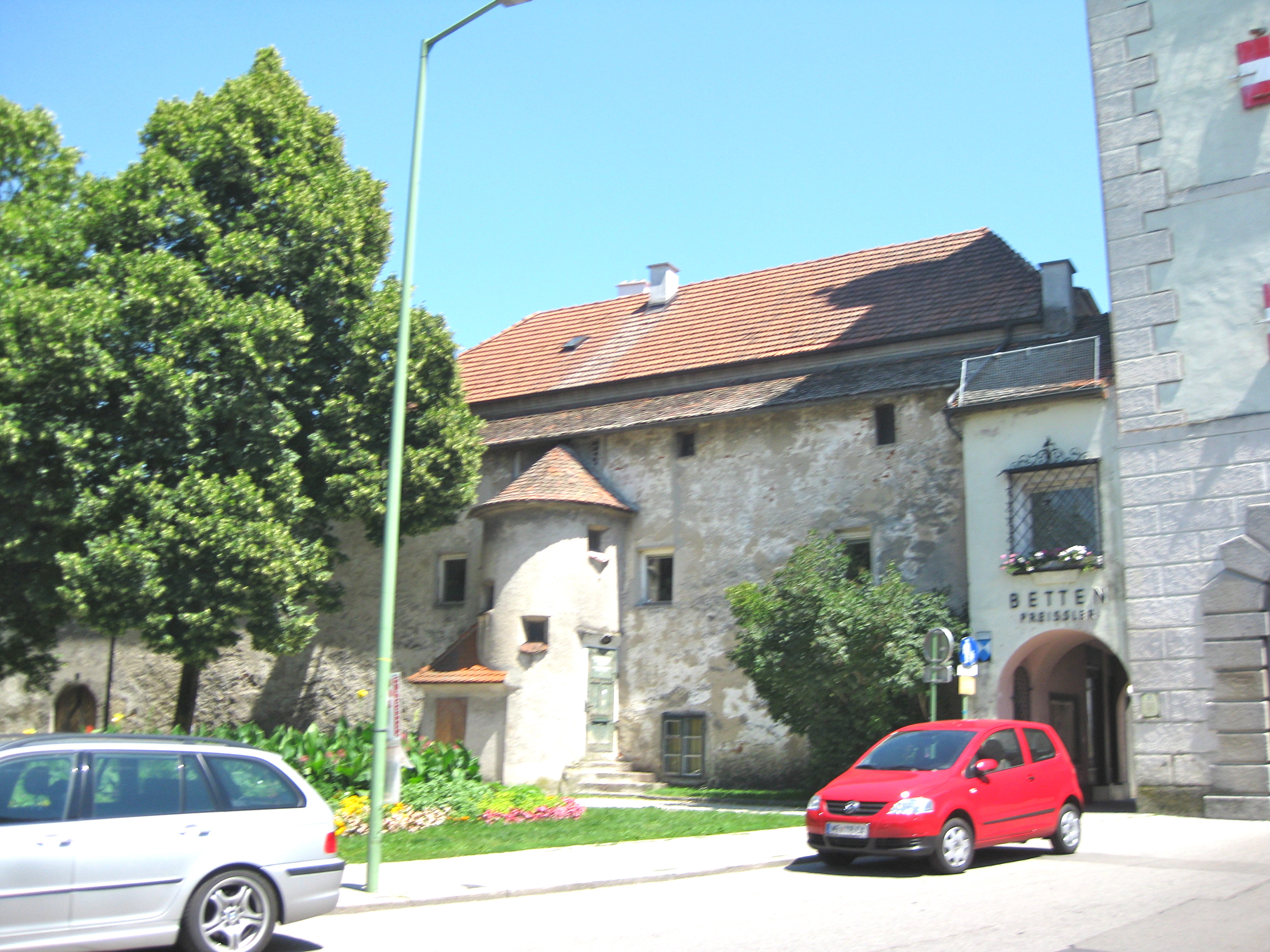
City wall next to Gate at Wels

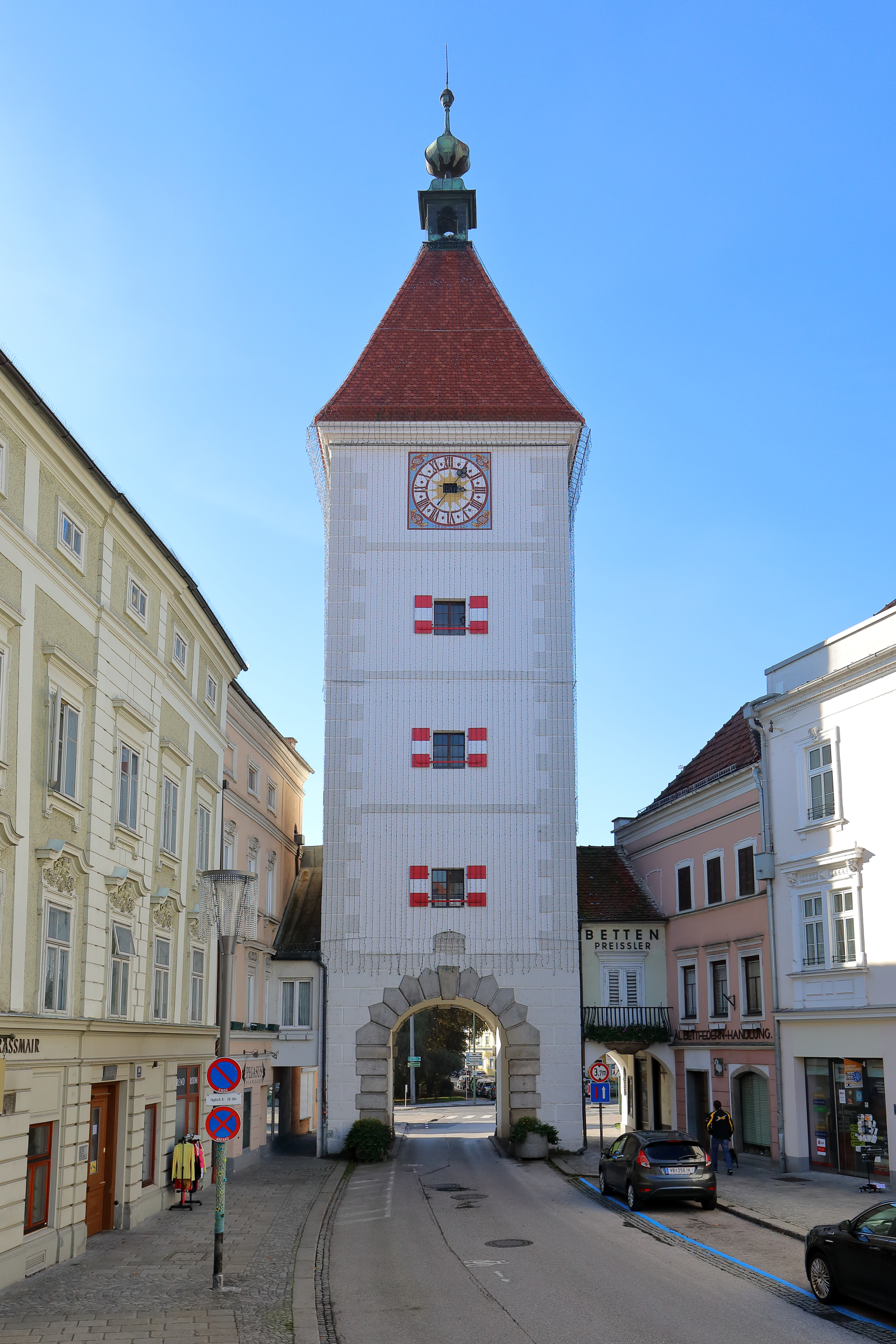
Wels City Gate

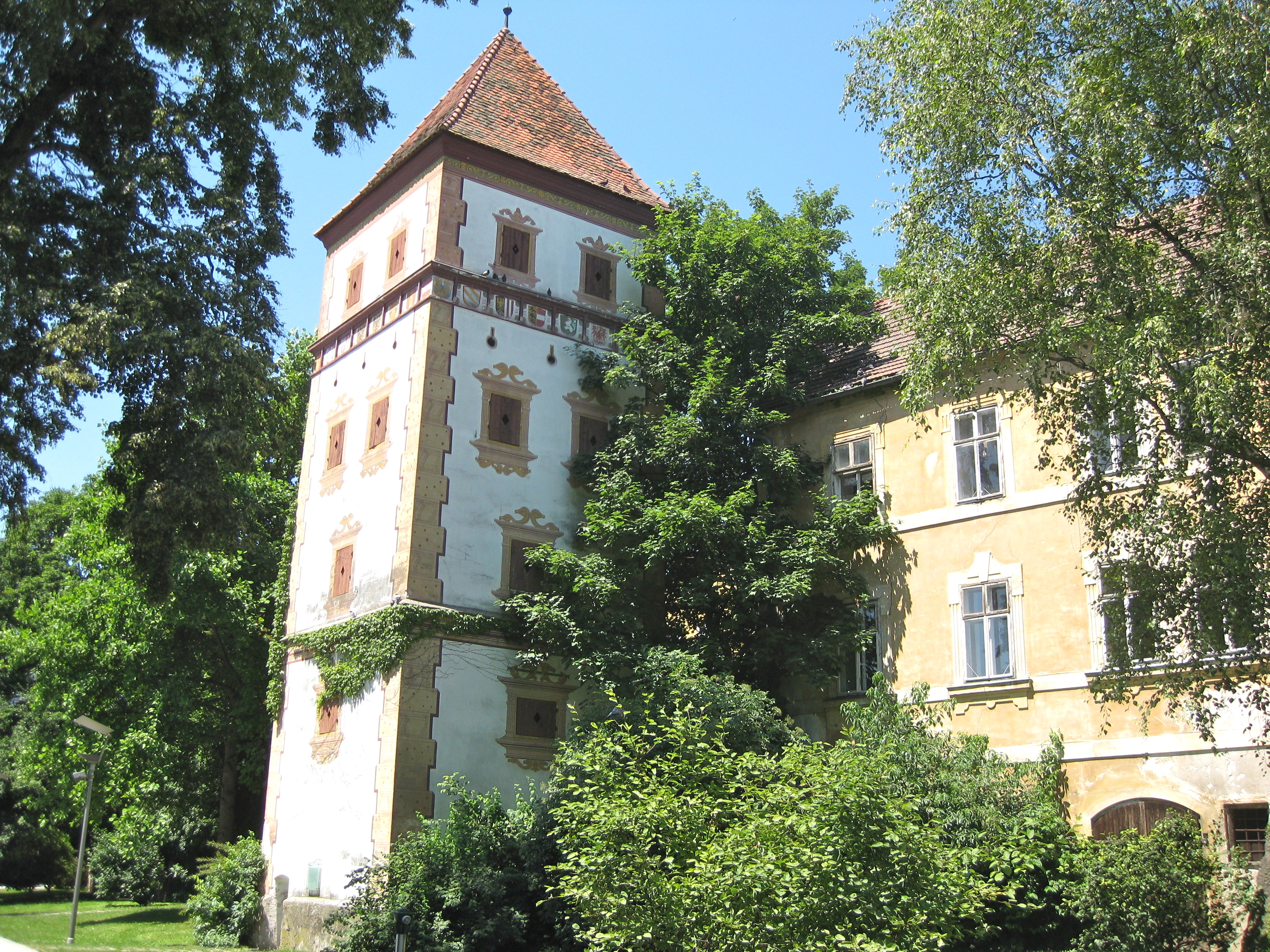
Wels, Corner Tower

=== Vienna ===
- The development of the city defences of Vienna are exceptionally well documented although there is little left of the defences today. The original Roman legionary fort is a rectangular block to the northwest of St Stephens Cathedral and is completely enclosed by the much larger medieval defensive circuit. The town walls as they existed before the Turkish siege of 1529 are shown in Hartmann Schedel’s print of Vienna in 1493 published in Liber Chronicarum. After the Turkish siege and particularly after the fall of Buda in 1541, the Vienna City Council started refortifying the city with bastions in the Italian manner. In 1547 Augustin Hirschvogel of Nuremberg was employed to draw up a plan of the new fortifications and this was published in 1552. At the same time Boniface Wolmuet, a Master Mason from Überlingen am Bodensee, who was probably the real architect of the alterations, also draw up his own detailed plan, which additionally provides much information about the medieval defences Alterations to the defences must have started earlier because Sebastian Munster’s print of 1548 shows that a new bastion was already in place. The two large prints of Vienna in Braun and Hogenberg’s Civitates Orbis Terrarum (Vol I) published in 1572 shows the defences as substantially complete. It was these defences that were to prove successful in largely withstanding the second Turkish siege in 1683.
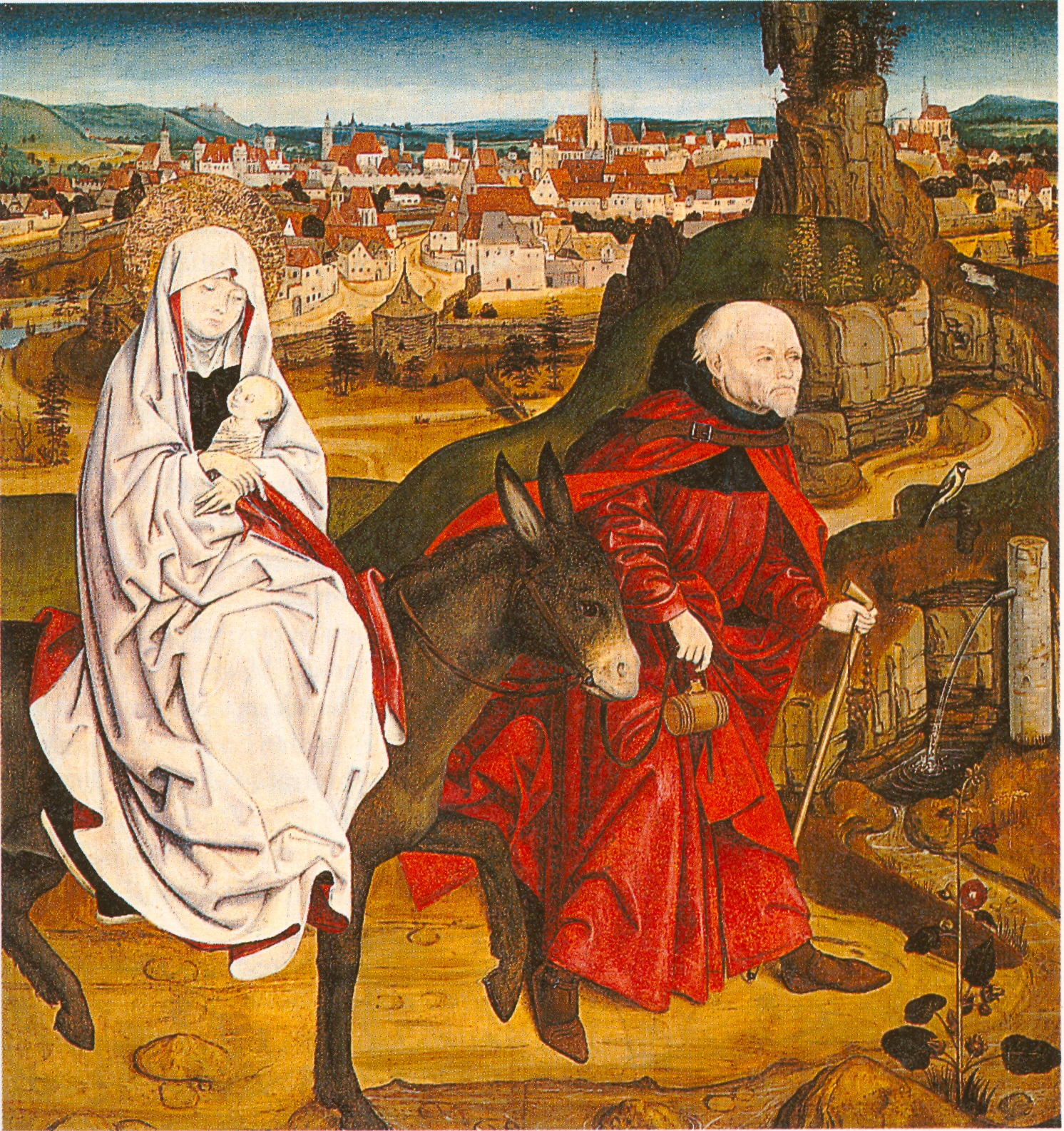
Schottenaltar-Wien showing the "Flight into Egypt", with Vienna in the background, c. 1400

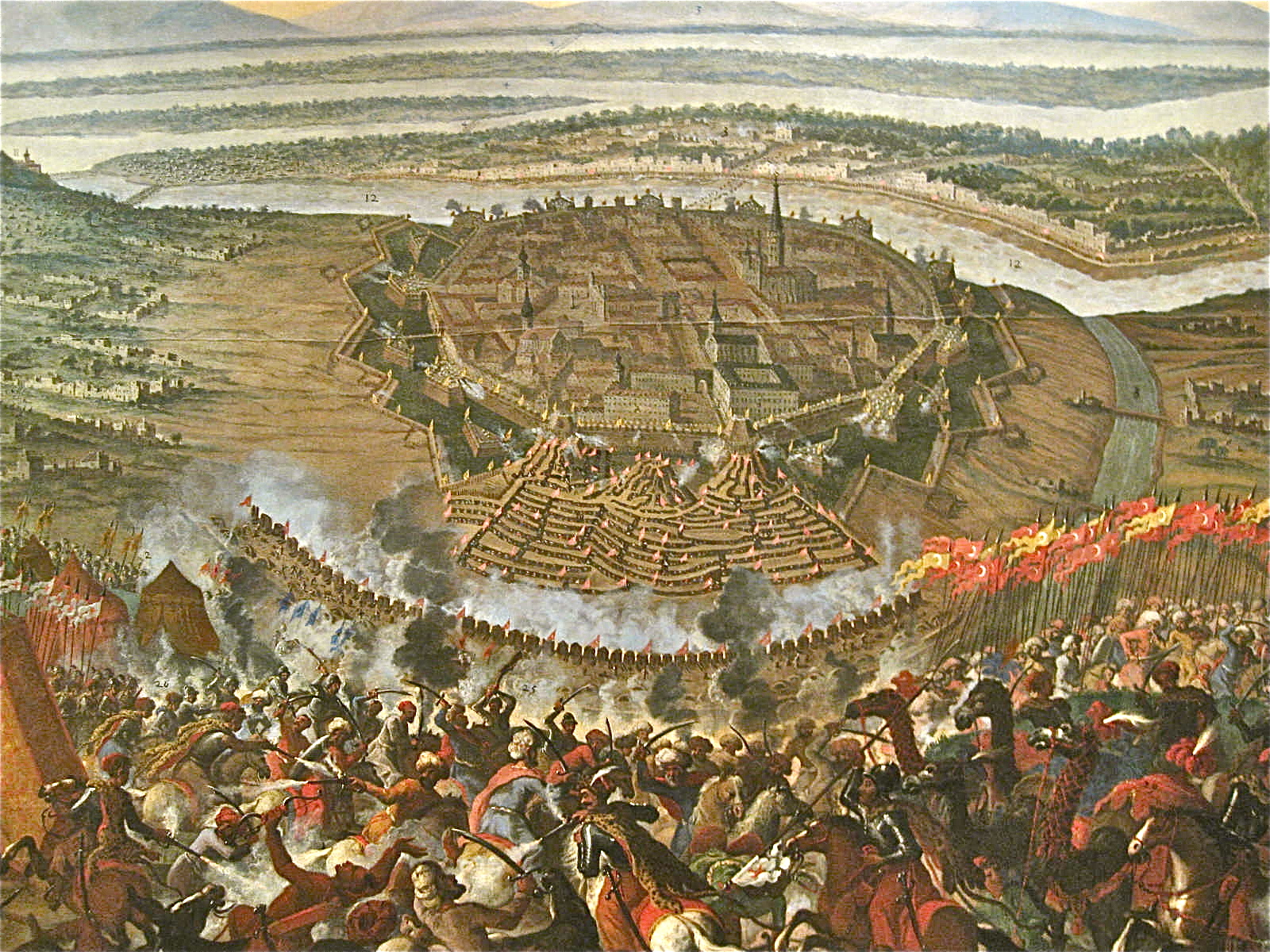
The Turkish Siege of Vienna 1683

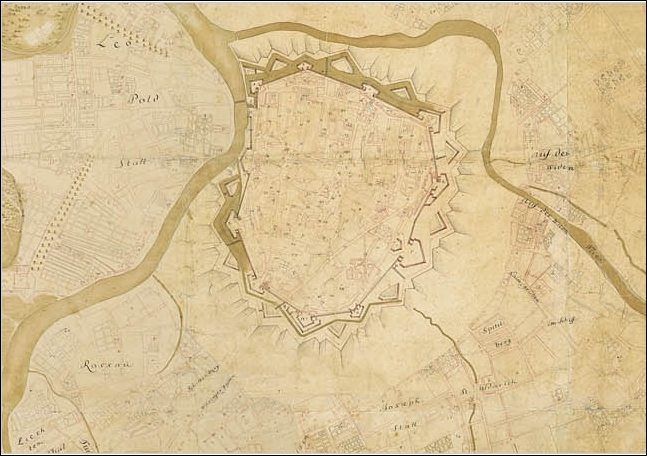
Plan of the defences in 1704.

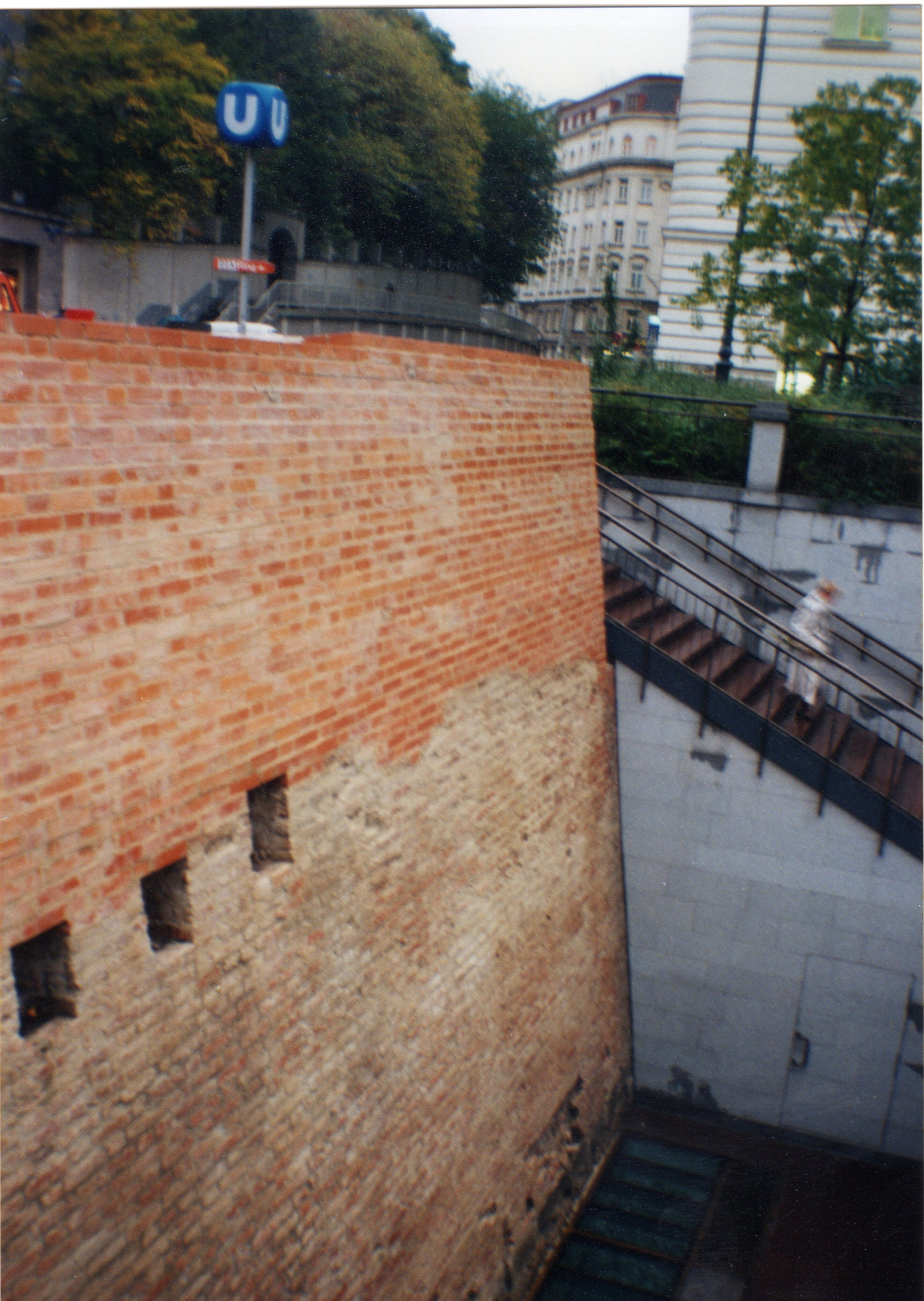
Remains of Vienna city Wall near the Stubentor

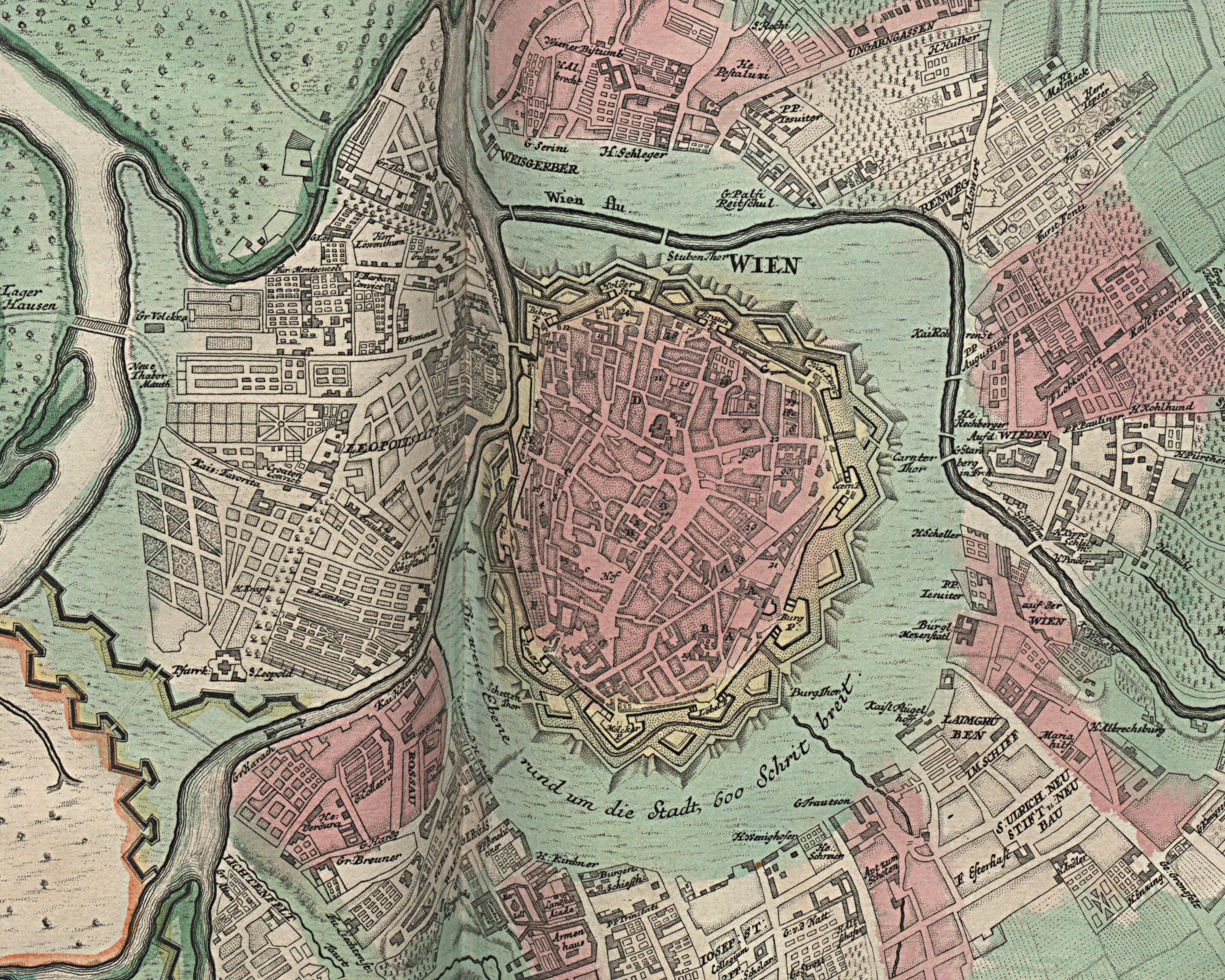
18th century Vienna showing the area kept clear, later to become the Ringstrasse

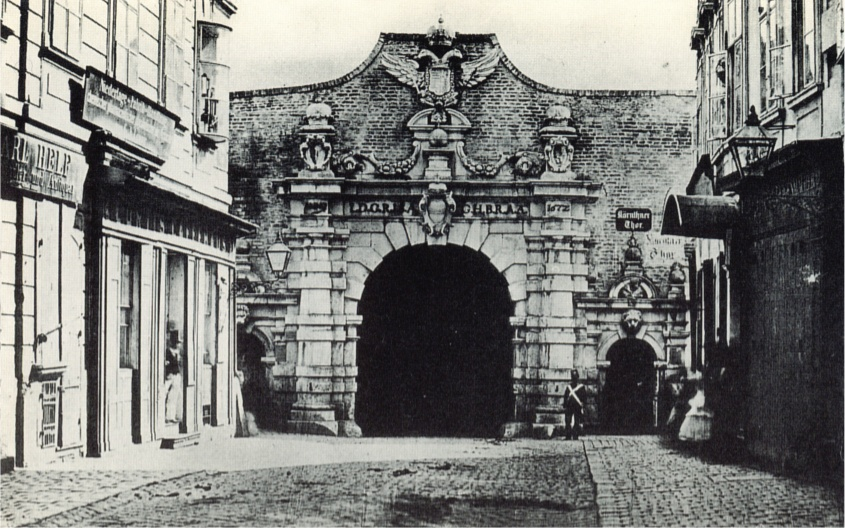
Kärntertor from the inside, 1858

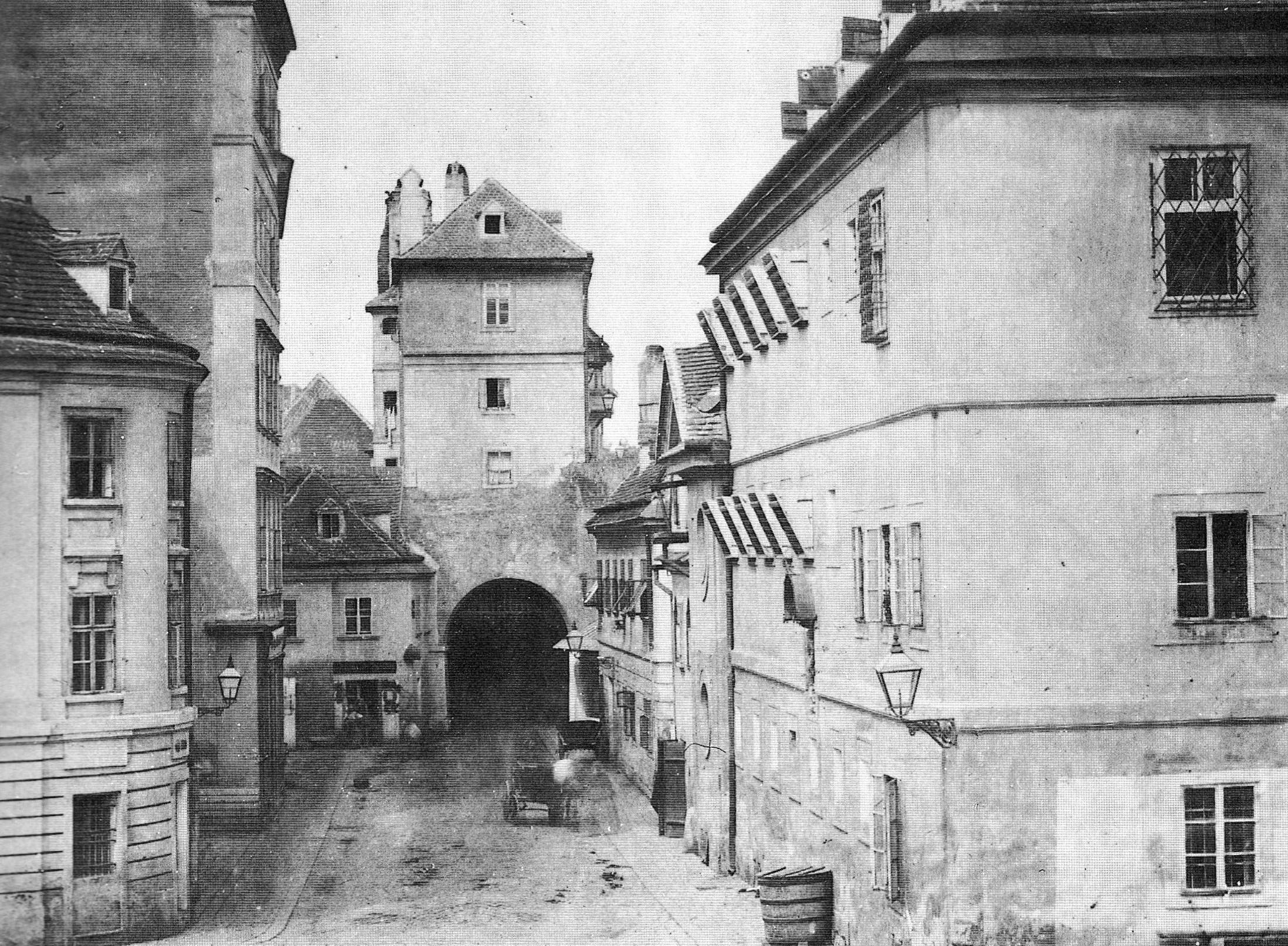
Wien Neutor1858

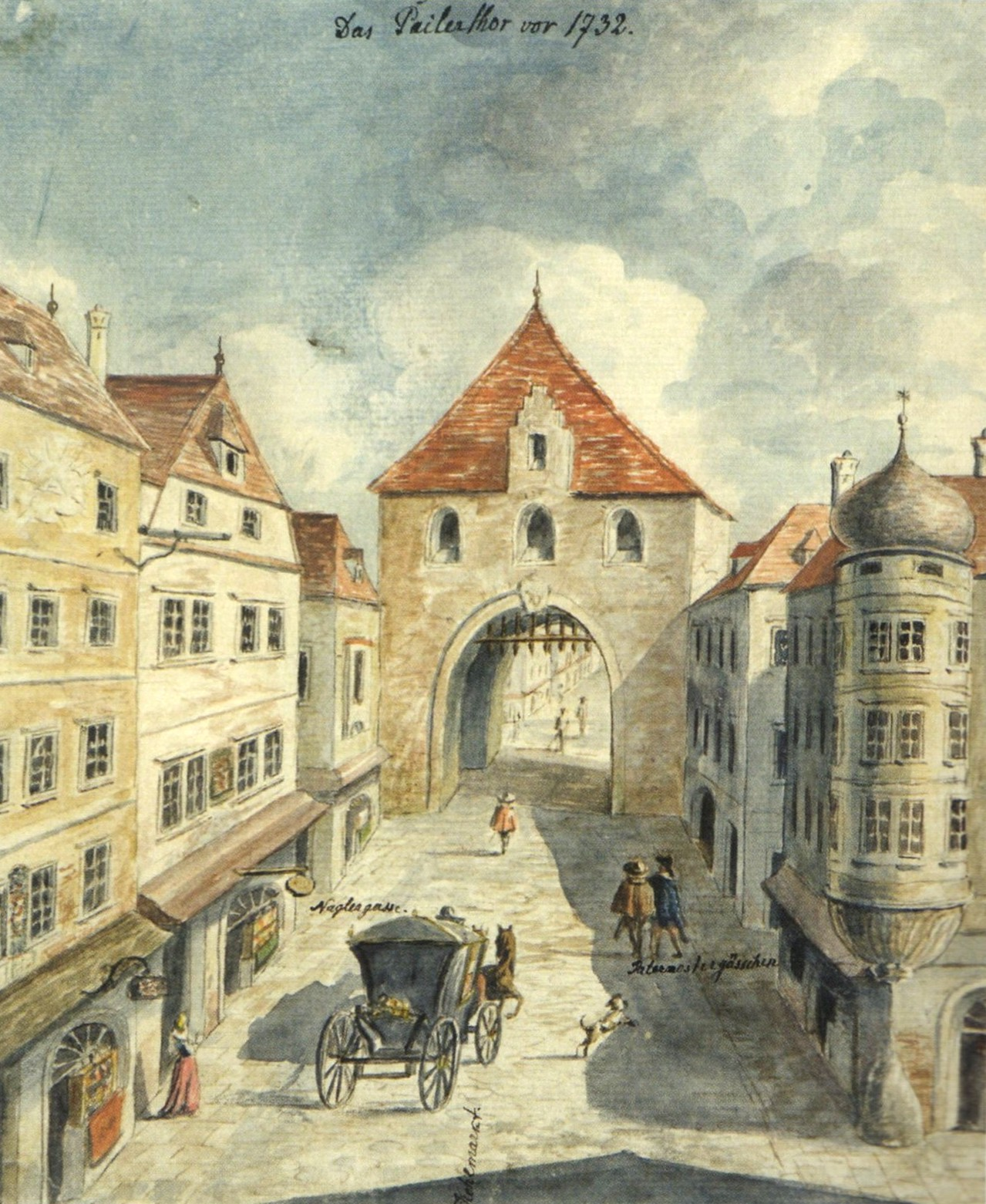
Wien Peilertor before 1732

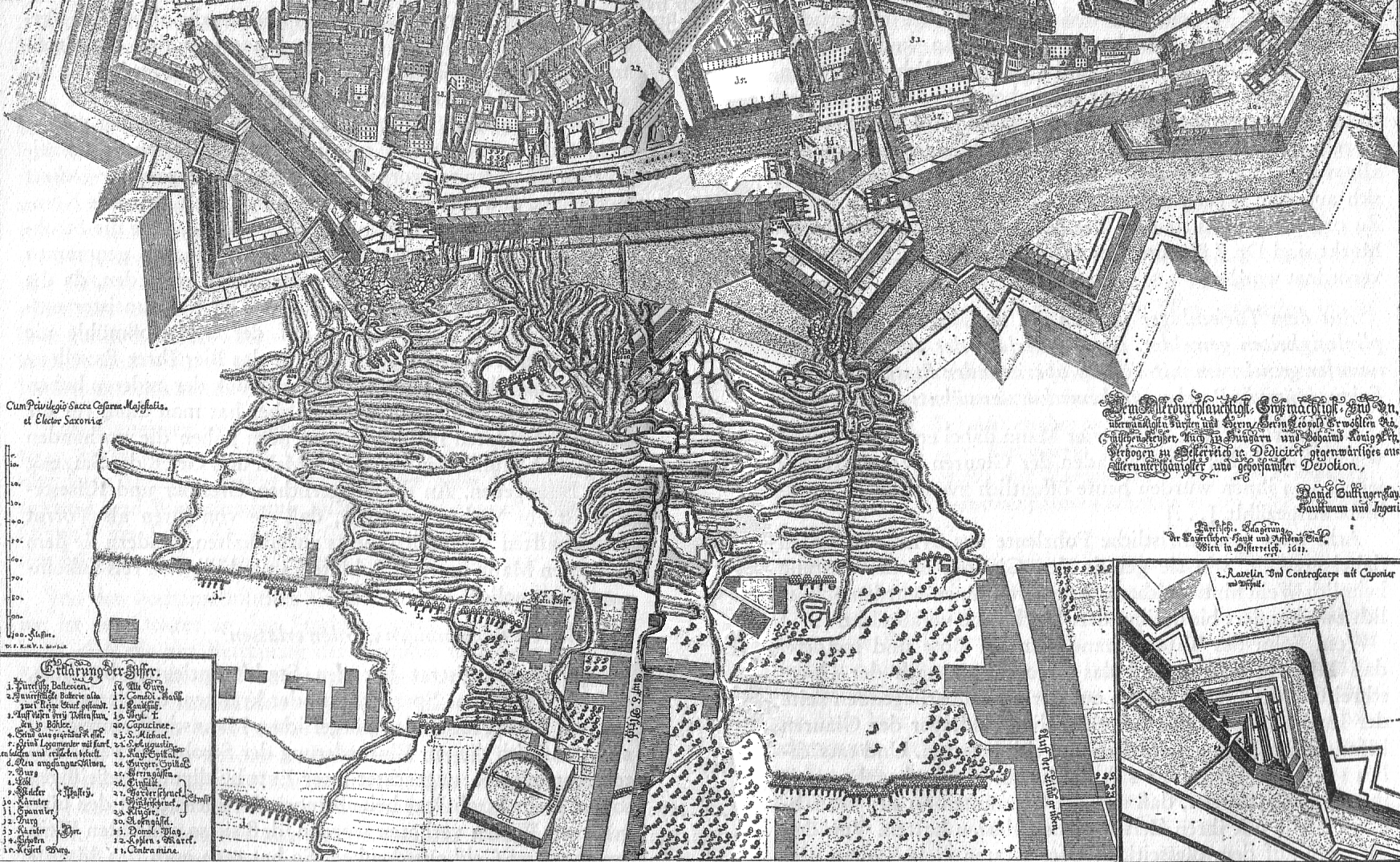
Plan of the Turkish siegeworks in 1683

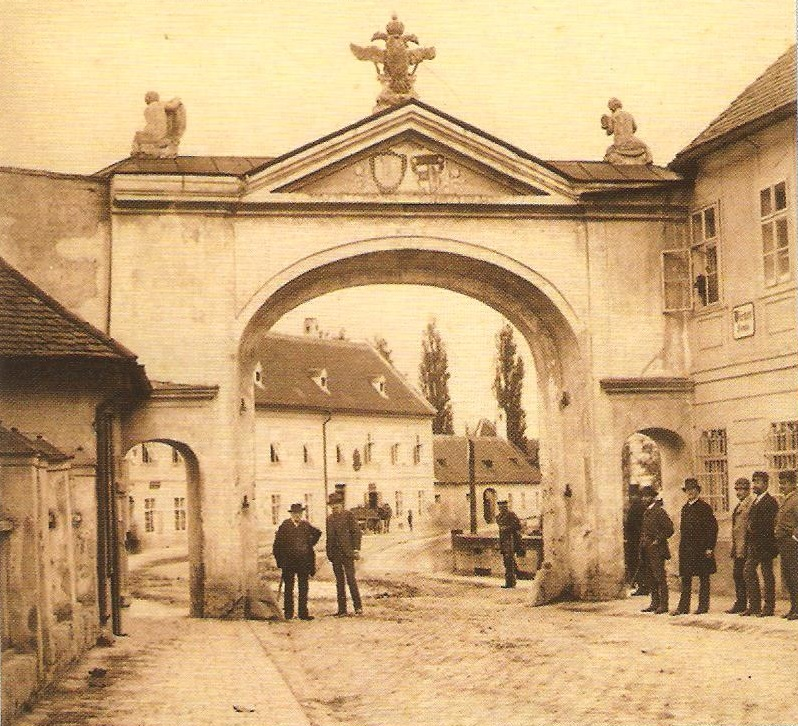
Wienertor before 1887

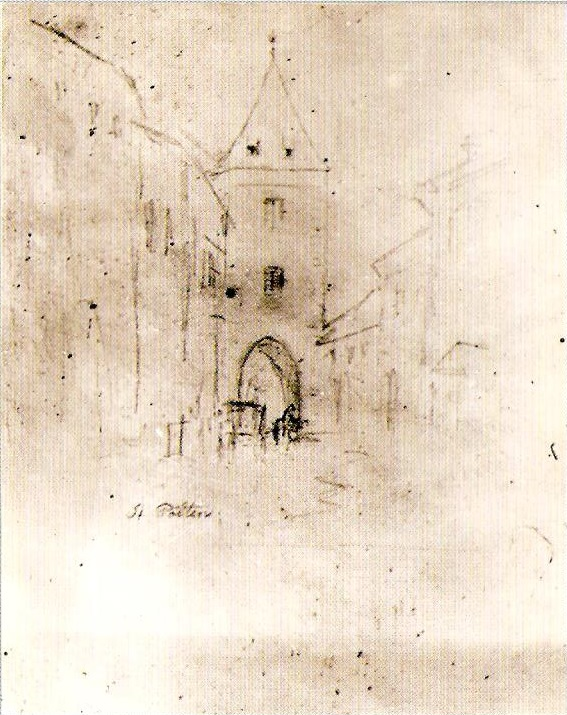
Linzertor, Friedrich Gauermann, 1825

=== Vorarlberg ===
- Bludenz. The defences with seven towers and three gates are shown by Matthäus Merian print in ‘Topographia Sueviae’ (Schwaben) 1643/1656, but only two gates and the Pulverturm survive. The town was founded by the Werdenberger family in 1265, and the Charter was granted through Hugo I. von Werdenberg in 1274
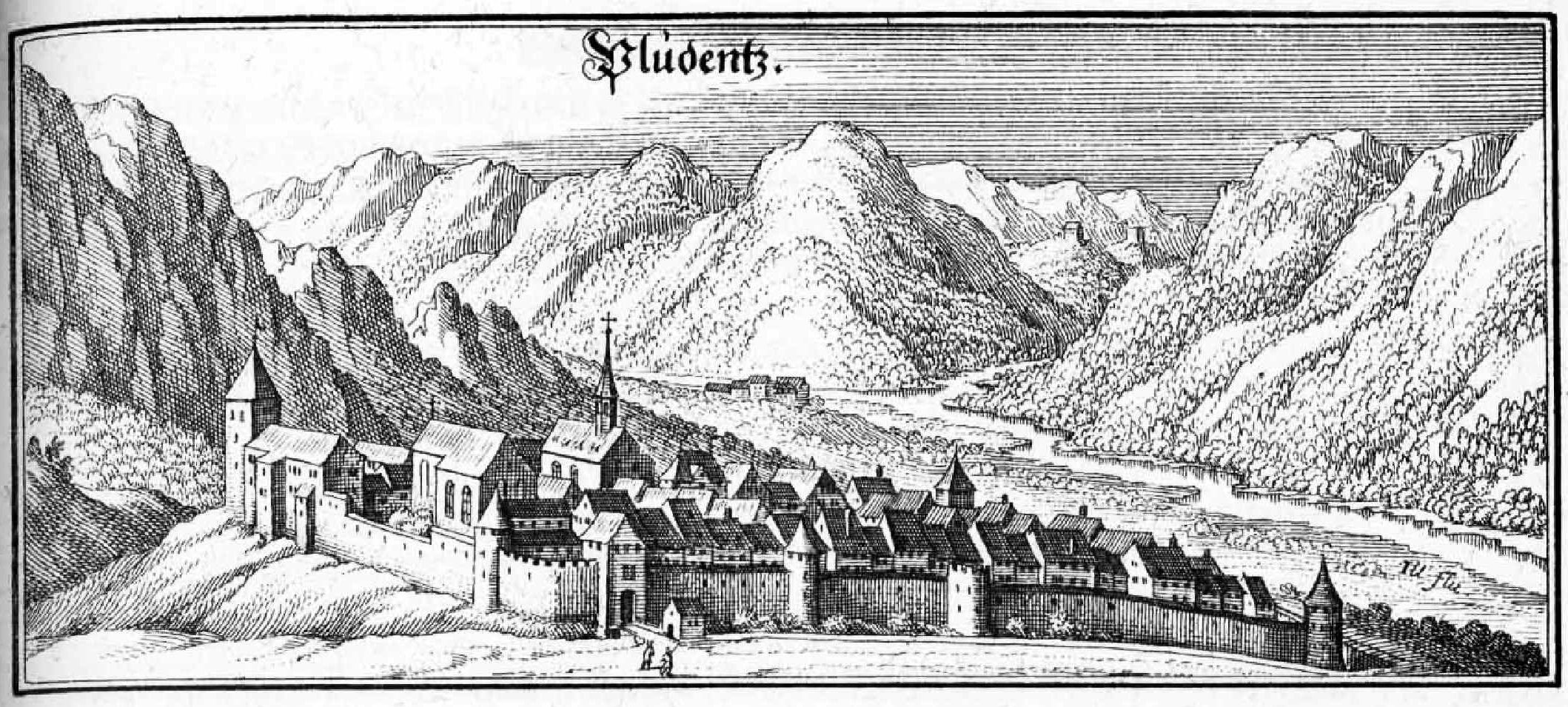
Merian Sueviae 212. View of Bludenz 1643

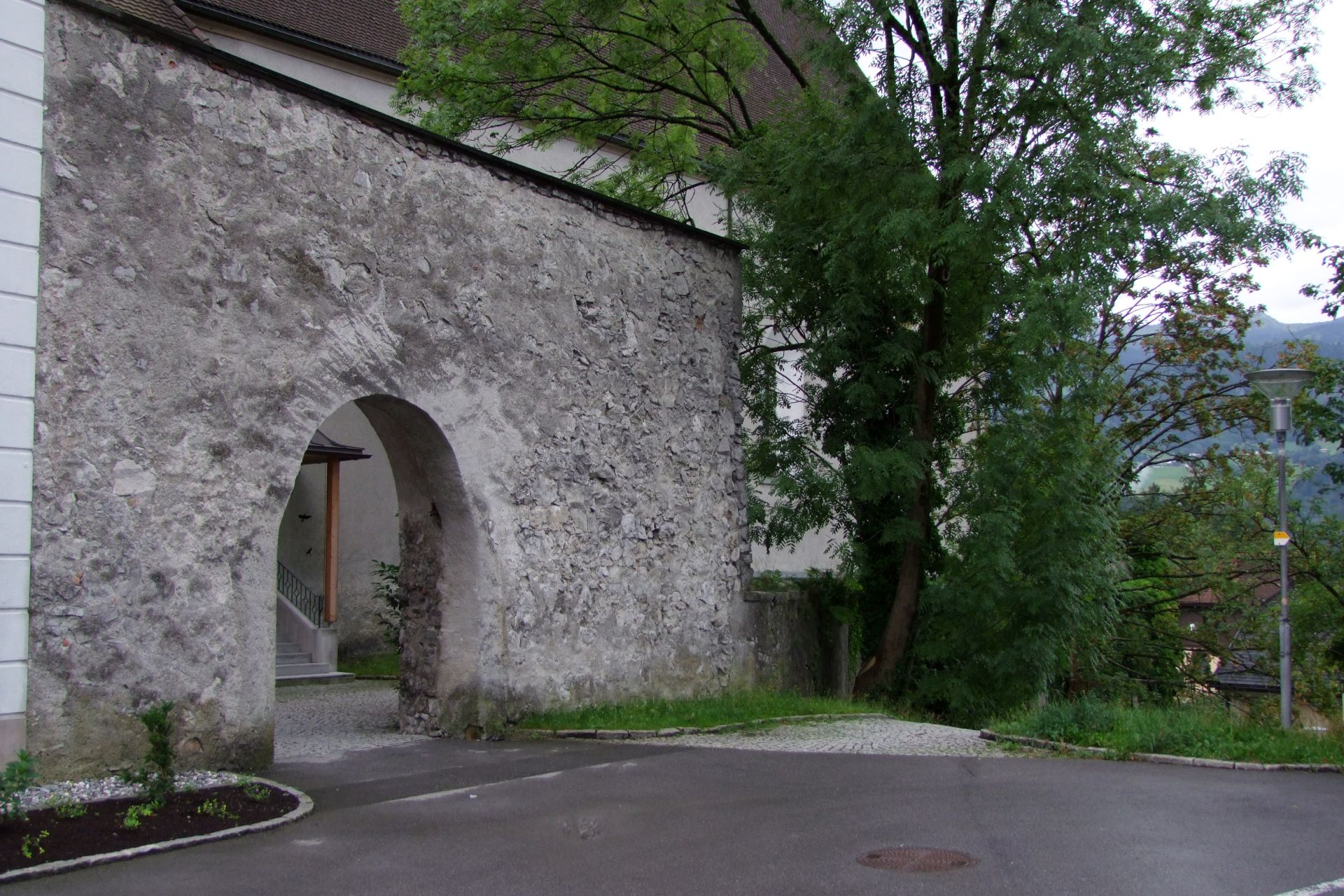
Bludenz Stadtbefestigung

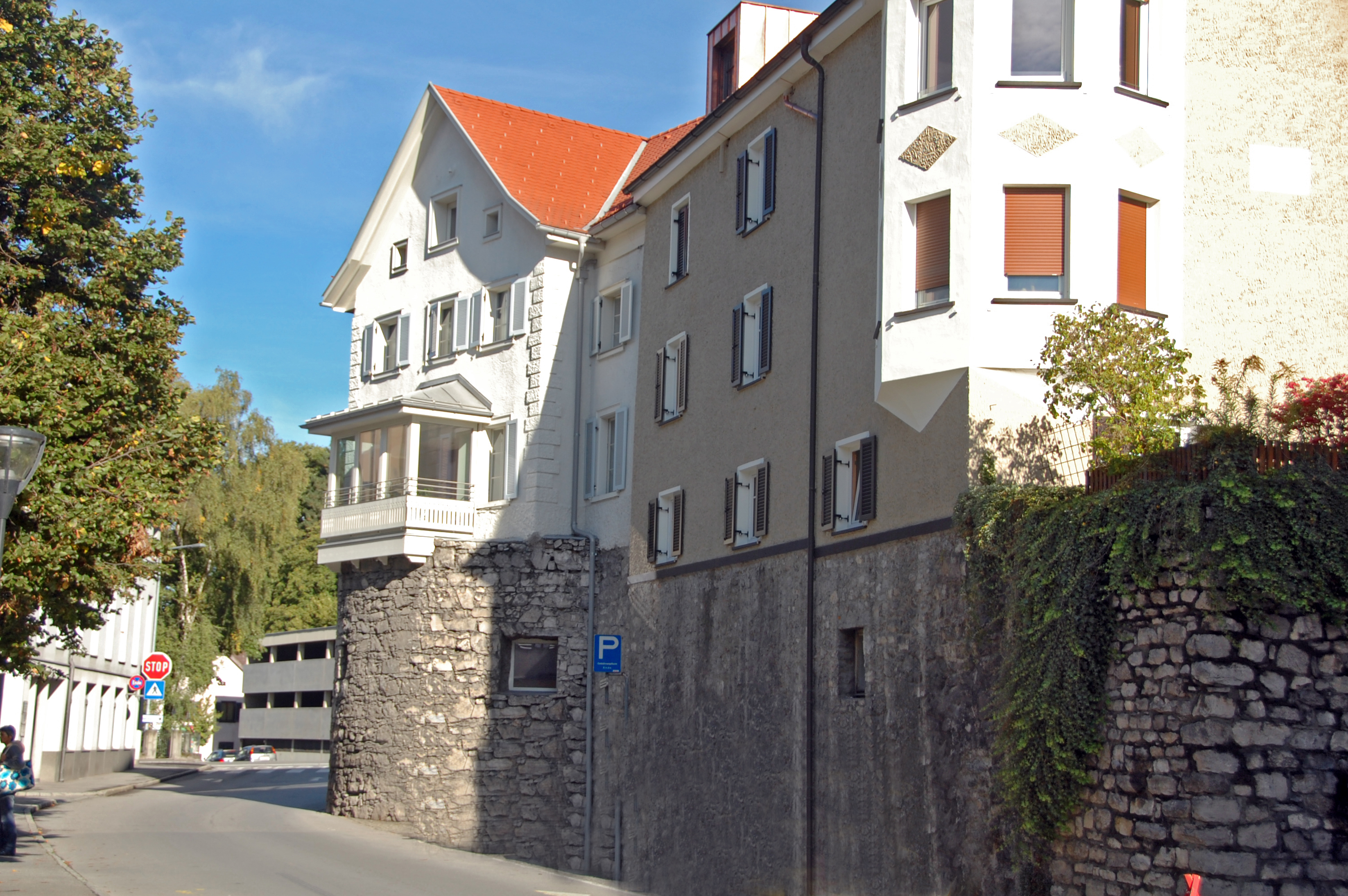
Stadtmauer, Pulverturmstraße Bludenz
- Bregenz. The ‘Obere Stadt’ is a small defended settlement on a plateau overlooking modern Bregenz and Lake Constance. The town was laid out with two parallel streets around 1220. The walls largely survive, together with the massive Martinsturm and the adjacent north gateway. The east gate-tower has disappeared.
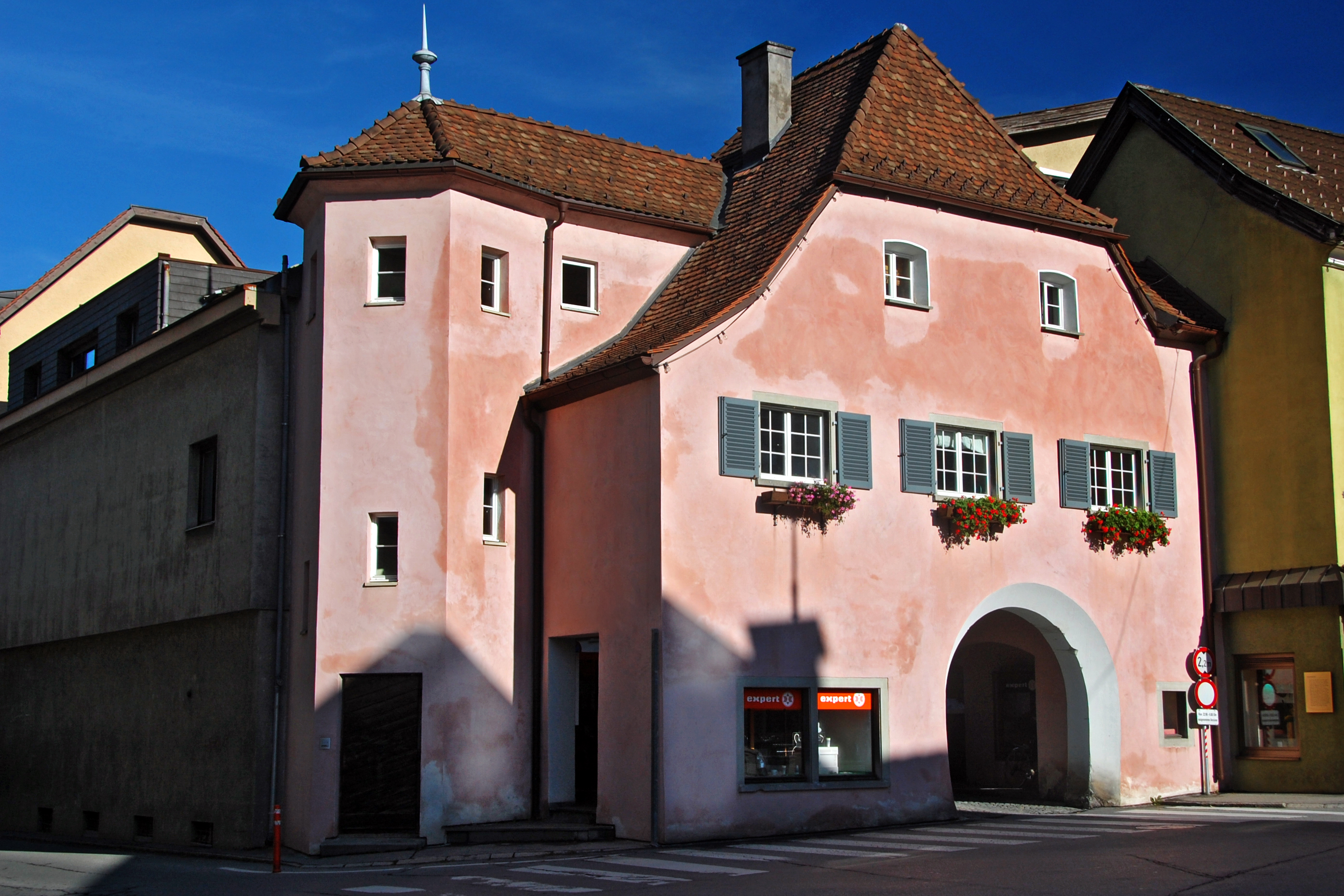
Unteres Stadttor, Bregenz

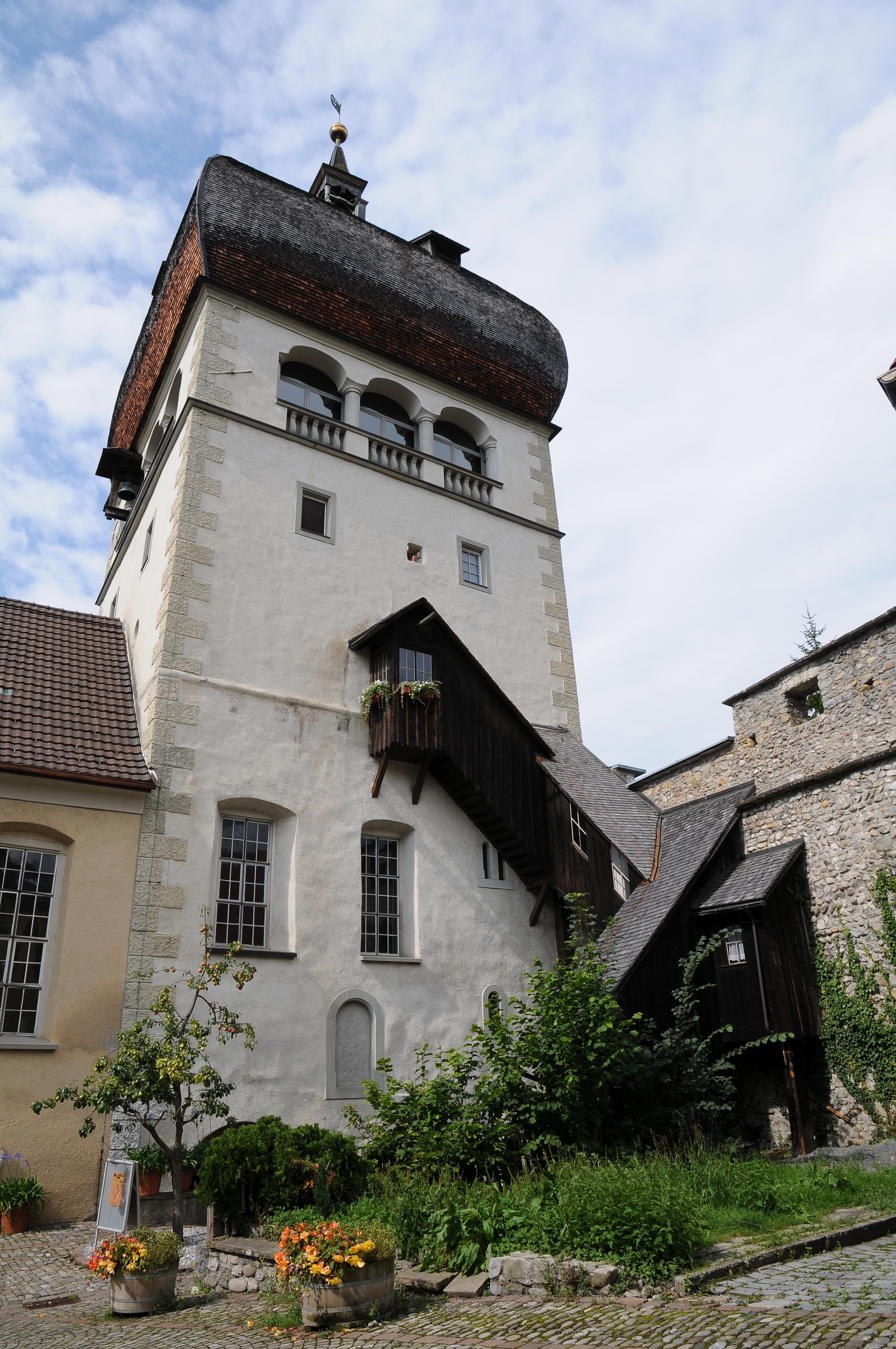
The Martinsturm, Bregenz

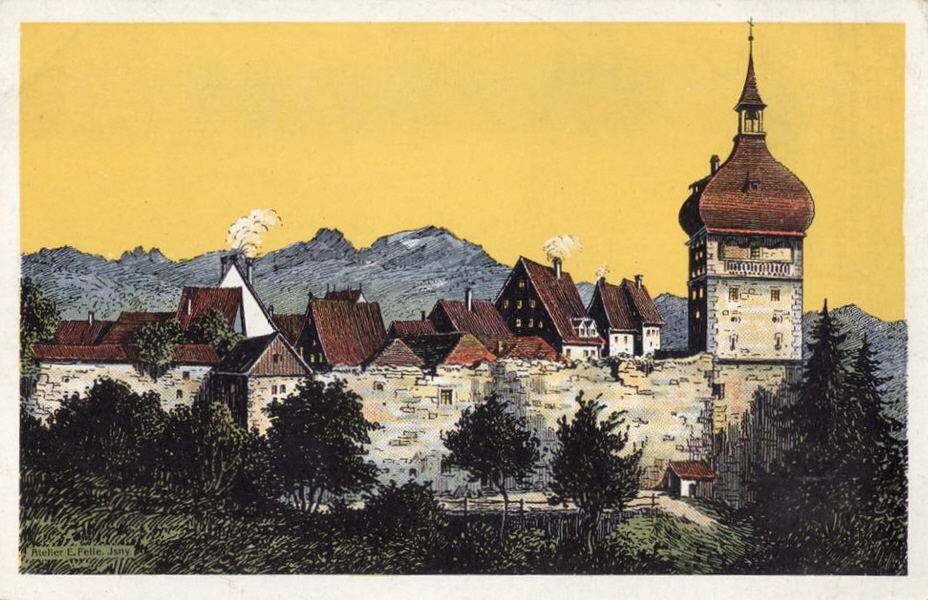
Bregenz Oberstadt, the Martinsturm
- Feldkirch. Sited on the river Ill, the town's defences, were remarkably well recorded in Sebastian Munster’s Cosmographia of 1550. The town is almost a rectangle with a grid street layout. The Schattenburg Castle occupies the southeast corner. Two gate-towers, the Wasserturm and Muhletor are on the river frontage, to the north the wide ditch is now filled in by the Hirschgraben, but the Churertor gate and the Katzenturm survive.
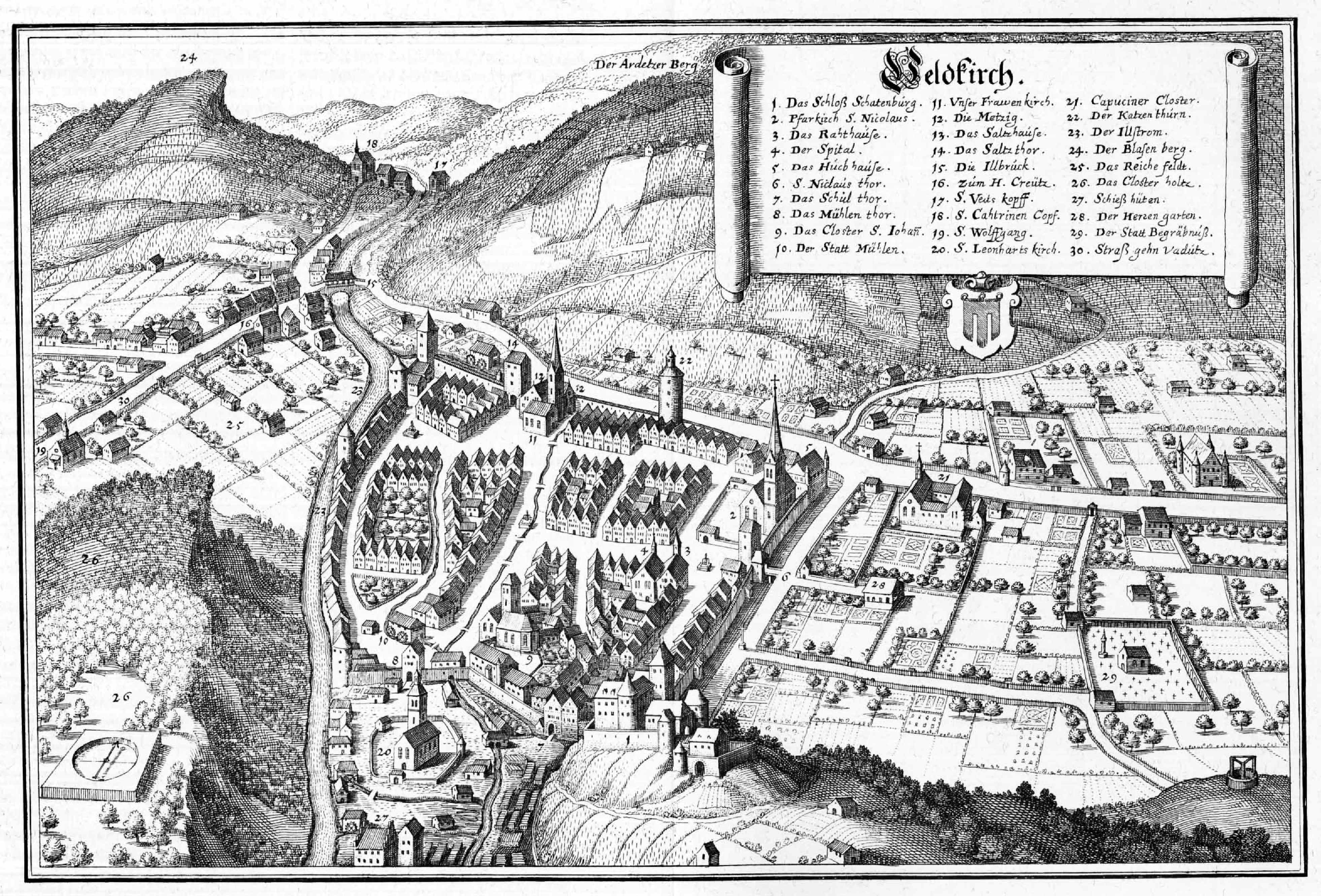
Merian "Sueviae", 1643, View of Feldkirch

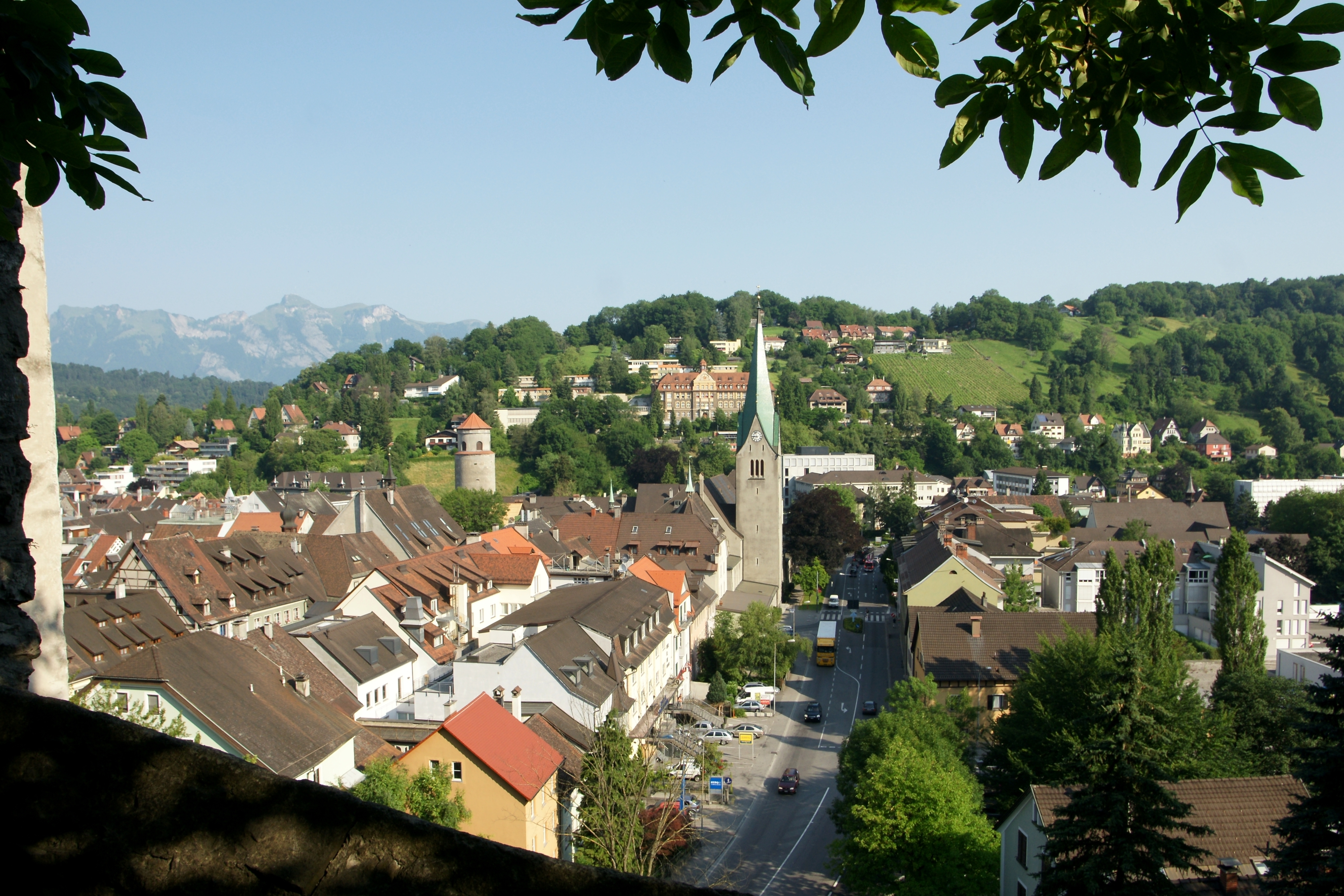
Feldkirch Ardetzenberg

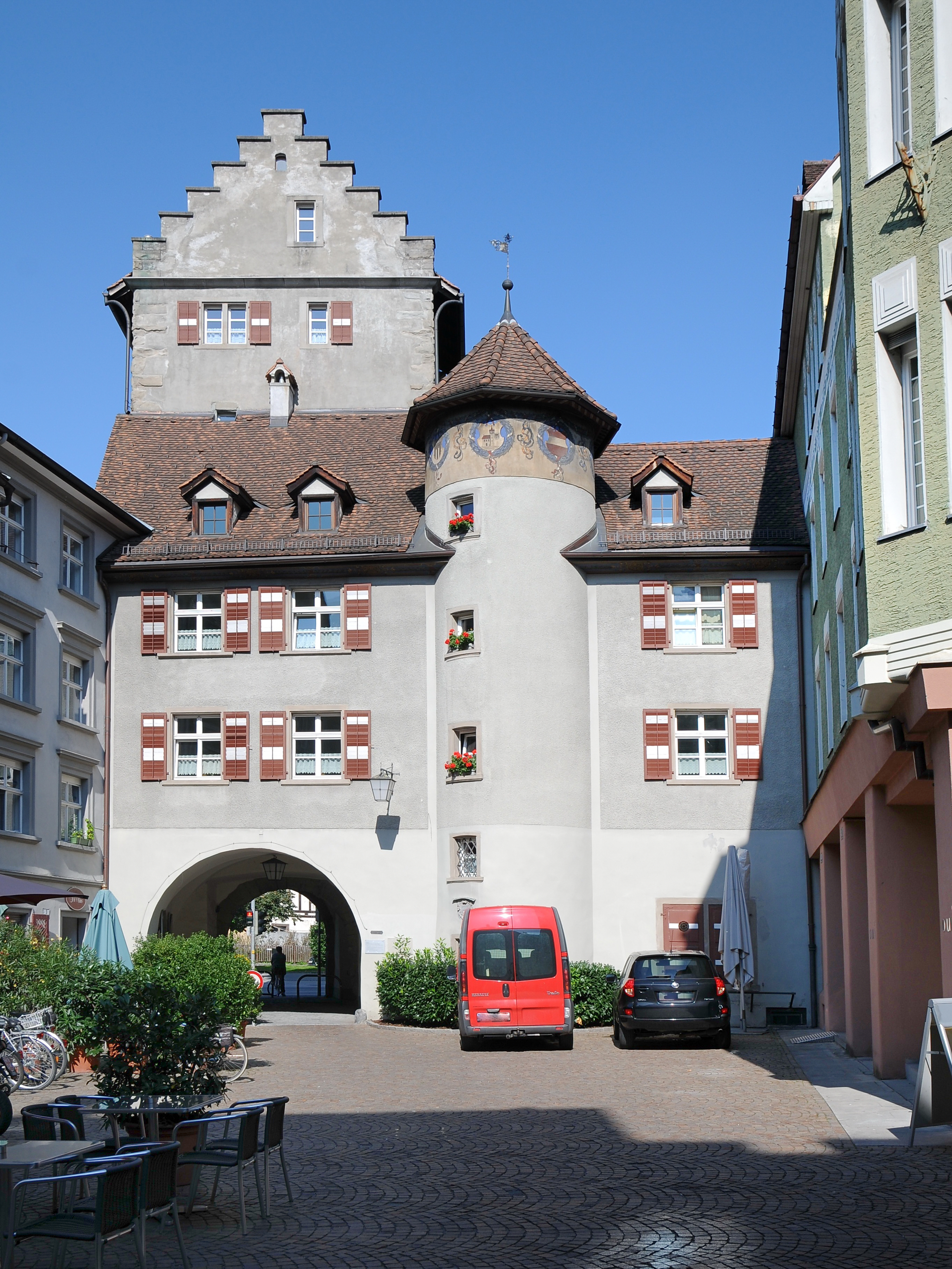
Churer Tor at Feldkirch

== Sources ==
- Herbert Erich Baumert, Georg Grüll: Burgen und Schlösser in Oberösterreich, Band 2: Salzkammergut und Alpenvorland. Birken-Verlag, Wien 1983, ISBN 3-85030-042-0.
- Peter Csendes, "Urban development and decline on the central Danube, 100–1600" in T R Slater, ed. ‘Towns in Decline AD 100–1600’,
- Dehio Niederösterreich nördlich der Donau. 1990
- Dehio- Niederösterreich südlich der Donau, 2003
- Dehio-Handbuch. Die Kunstdenkmäler Österreichs. Kärnten. Anton Schroll, Wien 2001, ISBN 3-7031-0712-X,
- C Duffy "Siege Warfare: The Fortress in the Early Modern World 1494–1660" RKP, London, 1979
- C Duffy "The Fortress in the Age of Vauban and Frederick the Great 1660–1789, Siege Warfare Volume II", RKP, London, 1985
- Franz Eppel -revised Eppel G & Zotti W, “Das Waldviertel: Seine Kunstwerke, Historischen Lebens-und Siedlungsformen” Verlag St Peter, Salzburg 1989.
- Kurt Woisentschläger, Peter Krenn: Die Kunstdenkmäler Österreichs. Dehio-Handbuch Steiermark: (ohne Graz). Anton Schroll & Co, Wien, 1982, herausgegeben vom Bundesdenkmalamt, ISBN 3-7031-0532-1
- Bundesdenkmalamt Österreich (Hrsg.): Dehio-Handbuch, die Kunstdenkmäler Österreichs. Topographisches Denkmälerinventar. Oberösterreich. Band 1: Peter Adam, Beate Auer u. a.: Mühlviertel. Berger, Horn/ Wien 2003, ISBN 3-85028-362-3.
